

7001–7100 

|-
| 7001 Noether || 1955 EH || Emmy Noether (1882–1935), German mathematician || 
|-id=002
| 7002 Bronshten || 1971 OV || Vitalii Aleksandrovich Bronshten (1918–2004), Russian meteor researcher || 
|-id=003
| 7003 Zoyamironova ||  || Zoya Sergeevna Mironova (1913–2008), Russian physician, specialist in sports medicine and trauma specialist to the Russian cosmonauts || 
|-id=004
| 7004 Markthiemens ||  || Mark H. Thiemens (born 1950), American chemist and areologist || 
|-id=005
| 7005 Henninghaack ||  || Henning Haack (born 1961), Danish curator of meteorites at the Geologisk Museum (Geological Museum) of the København Universitet (University of Copenhagen) || 
|-id=006
| 7006 Folco ||  || Luigi Folco (born 1965), Italian curator of meteorites at the National Museum of Antarctica ("Felice Ippolito") of the Universities of Genova, Siena and Trieste || 
|-id=007
| 7007 Timjull ||  || A. J. Timothy Jull (born 1951), American meteoriticist, editor of the journal Meteoritics and Planetary Science || 
|-id=008
| 7008 Pavlov ||  || Nikolaj Nikiforovich Pavlov (1902–1985), Russian astronomer || 
|-id=009
| 7009 Hume ||  || David Hume (1711–1776), British philosopher || 
|-id=010
| 7010 Locke ||  || John Locke (1632–1704), British philosopher || 
|-id=011
| 7011 Worley ||  || Charles Edmund Worley (1935–1997), American astronomer  † || 
|-id=012
| 7012 Hobbes ||  || Thomas Hobbes (1588–1679), British political philosopher || 
|-id=013
| 7013 Trachet ||  || Tim Trachet (born 1958), Belgian journalist and science writer. He is honorary chairman and general secretary of the Belgian skeptical organization, SKEPP, and the vice-chairman of the European Council of Skeptical Organisations, which he co-founded in 1994. || 
|-id=014
| 7014 Nietzsche ||  || Friedrich Nietzsche (1844–1900), German philosopher || 
|-id=015
| 7015 Schopenhauer ||  || Arthur Schopenhauer (1788–1860), German philosopher || 
|-id=016
| 7016 Conandoyle || 1991 YG || Arthur Conan Doyle (1859–1930), Scottish writer and physician, best known for his character Sherlock Holmes and his detective fiction || 
|-id=017
| 7017 Uradowan ||  || The Urado Bay, located in Kochi, Japan || 
|-id=019
| 7019 Tagayuichan ||  || "Tagayuichan", a little girl dressed as a shrine maiden, is the official mascot of Taga Town in Shiga Prefecture. || 
|-id=020
| 7020 Yourcenar ||  || Marguerite Yourcenar (1903–1987), pseudonym of French-Belgian-American writer Marguerite de Crayencour || 
|-id=021
| 7021 Tomiokamachi ||  || Tomiokamachi, a town in Fukushima prefecture, Japan. || 
|-id=023
| 7023 Heiankyo || 1992 KE || "Heiankyo", meaning "Peaceful Capital", is another name of Kyoto, Japan || 
|-id=026
| 7026 Gabrielasilang ||  || Gabriela Silang (1731–1763) was a leader of the Filipino fight for independence from Spain. A statue honoring her in Manila depicts her on a rearing horse, brandishing a bolo knife. || 
|-id=027
| 7027 Toshihanda || 1993 XT || Toshihiro Handa (born 1959), a research associate at the Institute of Astronomy, University of Tokyo. || 
|-id=028
| 7028 Tachikawa ||  || Tachikawa, a suburban city west of Tokyo.  || 
|-id=030
| 7030 Colombini || 1993 YU || Ermes Colombini (born 1956), an Italian amateur astronomer at San Vittore Observatory || 
|-id=031
| 7031 Kazumiyoshioka || 1994 UU || Kazumi Yoshioka (born 1953), an amateur astronomer who has published articles on astrophotography since 1988. || 
|-id=032
| 7032 Hitchcock ||  || Alfred Hitchcock (1899–1980), a British-born American movie director and producer. || 
|-id=035
| 7035 Gomi ||  || Kazuaki Gomi (1911–2000), amateur astronomer and long-time observer of variable stars. || 
|-id=036
| 7036 Kentarohirata ||  || Kentaro Hirata, an amateur astronomer in Yanagawa city. || 
|-id=037
| 7037 Davidlean ||  || David Lean (1908–1991), British film director. || 
|-id=038
| 7038 Tokorozawa ||  || Tokorozawa City is located in the south of Saitama Prefecture, Japan. The first airport in Japan was opened there in 1911 || 
|-id=039
| 7039 Yamagata ||  || The Yamagata Prefecture in Japan || 
|-id=040
| 7040 Harwood || 2642 P-L || Margaret Harwood (1885–1979) was an American astronomer and the first Director of the Maria Mitchell Observatory || 
|-id=041
| 7041 Nantucket || 4081 P-L || Nantucket Island, Massachusetts, United States, where the Maria Mitchell Observatory is located || 
|-id=042
| 7042 Carver ||  || George Washington Carver (1860–1943), credited by many as the first black American scientist. || 
|-id=043
| 7043 Godart || 1934 RB || Odon Godart (1913–1996), Belgian mathematician. || 
|-id=046
| 7046 Reshetnev ||  || Mikhail Fedorovich Reshetnev (1924–1996), an authority on theoretical and applied mechanics. || 
|-id=047
| 7047 Lundström ||  || Magnus Lundström (born 1967), Swedish astronomer †  || 
|-id=048
| 7048 Chaussidon ||  || Marc Chaussidon (born 1961), French geochemist || 
|-id=049
| 7049 Meibom ||  || Anders Meibom (born 1970), Danish meteoriticist || 
|-id=051
| 7051 Sean || 1985 JY || Sean Colin Woodard, grandson of the discoverers Carolyn and Eugene Shoemaker || 
|-id=052
| 7052 Octaviabutler ||  || Octavia E. Butler (1947–2006) was an African American author. Her work won multiple Hugo and Nebula awards and is praised for its incisive social criticism. || 
|-id=054
| 7054 Brehm ||  || Christian Ludwig Brehm (1787–1864) and Alfred Edmund Brehm (1829–1884), father and son, are two Thuringian naturalists. || 
|-id=055
| 7055 Fabiopagan || 1989 KB || Fabio Pagan (born 1946) is an Italian science journalist who covers space travel, astrobiology and physics. He has written for Trieste's Il Piccolo newspaper and he was a radio presenter on RAI, Italy's public national broadcaster. He was also press officer at the International Centre for Theoretical Physics in Trieste || 
|-id=056
| 7056 Kierkegaard ||  || Søren Kierkegaard (1813–1855), Danish religious philosopher || 
|-id=057
| 7057 Al-Fārābī ||  || Al-Farabi (c. 872–951) spent much of his life in Baghdad as a prominent philosopher, scientist and music scholar. He revived and internationalized the Aristotelian tradition, translated the philosopher's works from Greek to Arabic, and preserved and expanded upon them in his own writings || 
|-id=058
| 7058 Al-Ṭūsī ||  || Sharaf al-Dīn al-Ṭūsī (1135-c. 1213) was a Persian mathematician and astronomer who invented the linear astrolabe and developed new algebraic methods for solving certain types of cubic equations with positive solutions || 
|-id=059
| 7059 Van Dokkum ||  || Pieter van Dokkum (born 1972), a Dutch astronomer who studies the evolution of galaxies over cosmic time || 
|-id=060
| 7060 Al-ʻIjliya ||  || Al-ʻIjliyyah a 10th-century astrolabe maker working in the court of Sayf Al-Dawla, who was the emir of Aleppo from 945 to 967. Her father was also an astrolabe maker, and both were apprentices of Nastulus || 
|-id=061
| 7061 Pieri ||  || David C. Pieri (born 1949), American planetary geologist and volcanologist at NASA's Jet Propulsion Laboratory. || 
|-id=062
| 7062 Meslier ||  || Jean Meslier (1664–1729), a French priest and philosopher || 
|-id=063
| 7063 Johnmichell || 1991 UK || John Michell (1724–1793), an English clergyman and member of the Royal Society who studied geology, astronomy and gravity. He showed that gravity might explain double stars and star clusters, and he was the first to suggest the existence of black holes. || 
|-id=064
| 7064 Montesquieu ||  || Montesquieu (1689–1755), French political thinker || 
|-id=065
| 7065 Fredschaaf ||  || Fred Schaaf (born 1954) has spent a lifetime interpreting the night sky for the public. His monthly columns for Sky & Telescope magazine, begun in 1993, have introduced countless readers to the simple joy of locating a planet, bright star or constellation. He has also authored more than a dozen books on popular astronomy || 
|-id=066
| 7066 Nessus ||  || Nessus, mythological Greek centaur || 
|-id=067
| 7067 Kiyose || 1993 XE || Kiyose City, a western suburb of Tokyo, Japan || 
|-id=068
| 7068 Minowa ||  || Toshiyuki Minowa (1918–), Japanese amateur astronomer || 
|-id=072
| 7072 Beijingdaxue ||  || University of Beijing, founded in 1898, and the oldest national university in China || 
|-id=073
| 7073 Rudbelia ||  || Ol'ga Ivanovna Belyaeva (née Rudneva) is a teacher of English at the Moscow College and Institute of Economics, Politics and Law. || 
|-id=074
| 7074 Muckea ||  || Hermann Mucke, (1935–2019), director of the Urania Sternwarte and planetarium in Vienna. || 
|-id=075
| 7075 Sadovnichij ||  || Viktor Sadovnichiy (born 1939), Russian mathematician, Rector of the Moscow State University || 
|-id=077
| 7077 Shermanschultz || 1982 VZ || Sherman Schultz (1922–), American astronomy teacher at Macalester College for over 30 years, and who made many contributions to amateur telescope making † || 
|-id=078
| 7078 Unojönsson ||  || Uno Jönsson (born 1937), Swedish astronomer, author and friend of the discoverer Claes-Ingvar Lagerkvist || 
|-id=079
| 7079 Baghdad || 1986 RR || Baghdad was founded near one of the foremost cities of old Mesopotamia by the Arab Abbasid dynasty in the eighth century. Its beauty has inspired many poets and musicians, and it is still well known from stories such as Thousand and One Nights. || 
|-id=081
|-id=082
| 7082 La Serena ||  || La Serena, Chile, a beautiful small city near the Pacific, about 600 km north of Santiago de Chile. || 
|-id=083
| 7083 Kant ||  || Immanuel Kant (1724–1804), German philosopher || 
|-id=086
| 7086 Bopp ||  || Thomas Bopp (1949–2018), American amateur astronomer and discoverer of Comet Hale–Bopp || 
|-id=087
| 7087 Lewotsky ||  || Kristin and Gretchen Lewotsky, friends of the American discoverer Eleanor Helin || 
|-id=088
| 7088 Ishtar || 1992 AA || Ishtar, Akkadian goddess || 
|-id=091
| 7091 Maryfields || 1992 JA || Mary Fields (c. 1832–1914) was an African-American folk hero and trailblazer. She was a mail carrier in Montana in her 60s, braving harsh weather but never missing a day. Loved by her community, her birthday was a local holiday. She refused to be limited by social norms or laws. || 
|-id=092
| 7092 Cadmus || 1992 LC || Cadmus, Greek mythological figure || 
|-id=093
| 7093 Jonleake || 1992 OT || Jonathan Richard Leake (born 1959), British journalist, Science and Environment Editor for The Sunday Times || 
|-id=094
| 7094 Godaisan || 1992 RJ || Godaisan, a mountain in the Kōchi Prefecture of Japan. || 
|-id=095
| 7095 Lamettrie ||  || Julien Offray de La Mettrie (1709–1751), French medical doctor and philosopher || 
|-id=096
| 7096 Napier || 1992 VM || William M. Napier (born 1940), Scottish astronomer || 
|-id=097
| 7097 Yatsuka || 1993 TF || Yatsuka, a town in the Shimane Prefecture and home of Japanese discoverer Hiroshi Abe || 
|-id=098
| 7098 Réaumur ||  || René Antoine Ferchault de Réaumur (1683–1757), a French scientist and important entomologist. || 
|-id=099
| 7099 Feuerbach ||  || Ludwig Andreas Feuerbach (1804–1872), German philosopher and moralist || 
|-id=100
| 7100 Martin Luther || 1360 T-2 || Martin Luther (1483–1546), German theologian and religious reformer || 
|}

7101–7200 

|-
| 7101 Haritina || 1930 UX || Ioana Haritina Mogosanu (born 1973), populariser of astronomy and planetarium presenter at the Carter Observatory in New Zealand. || 
|-id=102
| 7102 Neilbone || 1936 NB || Neil Bone (born 1959), Scottish amateur astronomer, author and broadcaster (Src) || 
|-id=103
| 7103 Wichmann || 1953 GH || Moritz Ludwig Georg Wichmann (1821–1859) was an ardent observer of minor planets. A student of Bessel, he observed with the famous Königsberg heliometer. In 1853 he published a determination of the parallax of Groombridge 1830. The name was suggested by L. D. Schmadel || 
|-id=104
| 7104 Manyousyu || 1977 DU || Manyousyu, earliest collection of Japanese poetry || 
|-id=105
| 7105 Yousyozan ||  || Yousyozan is a 400-meter high mountain to the south of the Okayama station of the National Astronomical Observatory of Japan. Site testing for the observatory was conducted for about a year on this mountain, resulting in the observatory's construction. It was opened in 1960 || 
|-id=106
| 7106 Kondakov ||  || Aleksandr Konstantinovich Kondakov (born 1928), Soviet chemist and researcher on agricultural fertilizers || 
|-id=107
| 7107 Peiser ||  || Benny Josef Peiser (born 1957), British social anthropologist || 
|-id=108
| 7108 Nefedov ||  || Oleg Matveevich Nefedov (born 1931), vice president of the Russian Academy of Sciences and chairman of the National Committee of Russian chemists. An outstanding scientist in the field of physical, synthetic and technical organic chemistry, he is best known for his fundamental research on highly reactive intermediates and small cycles. Name proposed by the discoverer following a suggestion by the Institute of Applied Astronomy || 
|-id=109
| 7109 Heine ||  || Heinrich Heine (1797–1856), German poet. The name was suggested on the occasion of the 200th anniversary of Heine's birth. || 
|-id=110
| 7110 Johnpearse ||  || John Marshall Pearse (born 1930), Australian mechanical technician at the Perth Observatory (1981–2006) || 
|-id=112
| 7112 Ghislaine || 1986 GV || Ghislaine Crozaz (born 1939), Belgian meteoriticist and cosmochemist || 
|-id=113
| 7113 Ostapbender ||  || Ostap Bender, a fictional character in the novels The Twelve Chairs and  The Little Golden Calf written by Soviet authors Ilya Ilf and Yevgeni Petrov || 
|-id=114
| 7114 Weinek ||  || Ladislaus Weinek (1848–1913), a Czech astronomer and the ninth director of the Klementinum observatory in Prague, collaborated with Küstner in the discovery of polar motion. He published a lunar atlas based on photographs from the Lick Observatory. The name was suggested by J. Ticha and M. Šolc. || 
|-id=115
| 7115 Franciscuszeno ||  || Franciscus Zeno (1734–1781), Czech astronomer, palaeontologist and professor of mathematics at Prague University, was the second director of the Klementinum observatory in Prague. The name was suggested by J. Ticha and M. Šolc. || 
|-id=116
| 7116 Mentall || 1986 XX || E. Talmadge Mentall (born 1927), American astronomical atlas illustrator, who retired from a drafting career to join Sky Publishing Corporation in 1994. With his artistic skill and lifelong enthusiasm for astronomy, "Tal" soon played a pivotal role in the Millennium Star Atlas (1997), a joint undertaking with the European Space Agency's Hipparcos project. He meticulously drafted all the outlines of nebulae and measured the orientations of 2000 galaxies not available from the literature. Name proposed by R. W. Sinnott, endorsed by B. G. Marsden and the discoverer. || 
|-id=117
| 7117 Claudius ||  || Matthias Claudius (1740–1815), German poet and writer. He was an editor of the journal Messenger of Wandsbeck and is well known for his evening song Der Mond ist aufgegangen ( "The moon has risen"). || 
|-id=118
| 7118 Kuklov ||  || Kuklov, village in Czech Republic || 
|-id=119
| 7119 Hiera ||  || Hiera, mythical person related to Trojan War || 
|-id=120
| 7120 Davidgavine ||  || David Myles Gavine (1937–1920), a Scottish astronomy historian. || 
|-id=121
| 7121 Busch ||  || Wilhelm Busch (1832–1908), a German poet, who became world-renowned for his popular humorous and satiric picture stories. || 
|-id=122
| 7122 Iwasaki ||  || Kazuaki Iwasaki (born 1935), amateur astronomer and world-renowned space artist. His work has been frequently exhibited and he has published many books on the subject of space art. In July 1998 he opened his own space art gallery in Ito City, Shizuoka Prefecture. Name proposed by the discoverers following a suggestion by T. Sato and A. Fujii || 
|-id=124
| 7124 Glinos ||  || Tom Glinos (born 1960), Canadian astronomer † || 
|-id=125
| 7125 Eitarodate ||  || Eitaro Date (1912–1953), Japanese amateur astronomer || 
|-id=126
| 7126 Cureau ||  || Marin Cureau de la Chambre, French medical doctor and scientist || 
|-id=127
| 7127 Stifter ||  || Adalbert Stifter (1805–1868), Austrian poet, novelist and narrator || 
|-id=128
| 7128 Misawa ||  || Katsue Misawa (1885–1937). Although he received only a limited education, through his own efforts he became a junior-high-school geography teacher. His unique teaching practices are highly appreciated in the history of Japanese education. In astronomy, he was the real pioneer of sunspot observation in Japan, systematically observing sunspots from 1921 until 1934, when failing eyesight prevented it. His data were invaluable because in those days foreign data arrived in Japan only after a long delay. Name proposed by the discoverers following a suggestion by K. Gomi, T. Sato, K. Fujimori and A. Fujii || 
|-id=130
| 7130 Klepper ||  || Jochen Klepper (1903–1942), a German writer, lyric poet and journalist || 
|-id=131
| 7131 Longtom || 1992 YL || Longtom, the nine-pound cannon in Treasure Island, is the nickname of the Nikon 10-cm refractor used regularly by Hoei Nojiri (1885–1977), who ordered the telescope and translated Stevenson's novel into Japanese in 1928. The telescope was at one time also used by Tokyo astronomer Koichiro Tomita || 
|-id=132
| 7132 Casulli || 1993 SE || Silvano Casulli (born 1944), Italian amateur astronomer || 
|-id=133
| 7133 Kasahara ||  || Shin Kasahara (born 1953), doctor of dentistry and senior lecturer at Tohoku University. An amateur astronomer, he has been enthusiastically engaged in positional observation and orbit calculation of minor planets and comets since 1973. He also played an important role in designing and constructing the biggest portable telescope in Japan, the 84-cm Chiro Memorial Telescope, which went on a national tour to allow the observation of comet 1P/Halley. Name proposed by the discoverers following a suggestion by M. Koishikawa and A. Fujii || 
|-id=134
| 7134 Ikeuchisatoru || 1993 UY || Satoru Ikeuchi (born 1944) works mainly on the evolution of the interstellar medium and the formation of large-scale structure of the universe. He is a member of the Science Council of Japan and served as the Japanese national representative to the IAU since 1997 || 
|-id=136
| 7136 Yokohasuo ||  || Yoko Hasuo (born 1952), the wife of Japanese amateur astronomer Ryuichi Hasuo, was cotranslator of the International Halley Watch manual into Japanese. She has been supportive of her husband's activity as a member of the Comet Conference and Cometary Summer School in Japan  (also see ) || 
|-id=137
| 7137 Ageo ||  || The Japanese city of Ageo, located north of Tokyo in Saitama Prefecture. The name was suggested by M. Sekine. || 
|-id=139
| 7139 Tsubokawa ||  || Ietsune Tsubokawa (1918–1994), Japanese astronomer and fifth director of the International Latitude Observatory in Mizusawa during 1976–1986, and a former director of the Earthquake Research Institute, University of Tokyo. || 
|-id=140
| 7140 Osaki ||  || Yoji Osaki (born 1938) works mainly in stellar physics and served as president of the Japan Astronomical Society during 1999–2000. In 1974 he proposed the disk-instability model for outbursts of dwarf novae, a model that is now widely accepted || 
|-id=141
| 7141 Bettarini ||  || Otello Bettarini (1905–1982), an Italian pioneer who built the discovering Cima Ekar Station (098) || 
|-id=142
| 7142 Spinoza ||  || Baruch Spinoza (Benedict de Spinoza), Dutch-Jewish philosopher ‡ || 
|-id=143
| 7143 Haramura ||  || Haramura is a village in Nagano prefecture, 200 km east of Tokyo. A large star party is held there each summer || 
|-id=144
| 7144 Dossobuono || 1996 KQ || The northeastern Italian village of Dossobuono, province of Verona, where the discovering Madonna di Dossobuono Observatory  is located. || 
|-id=145
| 7145 Linzexu || 1996 LO || Lin Zexu (1785–1850), Chinese scholar and official during the Qing dynasty, known for his campaign against drug abuse and drug-related crimes, as well as for his achievements in water conservancy. || 
|-id=146
| 7146 Konradin || 3034 P-L || Konradin Ferrari d'Occhieppo (1907–2007), Austrian professor emeritus of astronomy of Vienna University and member of the Austrian Academy of Sciences (bio-de). || 
|-id=147
| 7147 Feijth || 4015 P-L || Hendrik Feijth (born 1944), Dutch amateur astronomer and observer of variable stars † || 
|-id=148
| 7148 Reinholdbien || 1047 T-1 || Reinhold Bien (born 1947), German astronomer at ARI in Heidelberg. || 
|-id=149
| 7149 Bernie || 3220 T-3 || Hans-Heinrich Bernstein (born 1953), German astronomer at ARI in Heidelberg || 
|-id=150
| 7150 McKellar ||  || Andrew McKellar (1910–1960), who, in 1941, measured the temperature of interstellar space as about 2.7 Kelvin, based on the rotational spectrum of the cyanogen molecule. This radiation temperature arises from the cosmic primeval fireball and is one of the most fundamental and revealing cosmic parameters || 
|-id=152
| 7152 Euneus ||  || Euneus, king of Lemnos and a son of Jason from Greek mythology || 
|-id=153
| 7153 Vladzakharov ||  || Vladimir E. Zakharov (born 1939), a Soviet and Russian mathematician and theoretical physicist. He was a former director of the Landau Institute for Theoretical Physics near Moscow in Russia. || 
|-id=154
| 7154 Zhangmaolin ||  || Zhang Maolin (1991–2019) was a young Chinese astronomer. After completing an engineering degree at Tsinghua University, he entered the PhD program in astronomy at Leiden University. He studied radio galaxies with the LOFAR radio telescope, but died prematurely in a house fire before he could complete his degree. || 
|-id=156
| 7156 Flaviofusipecci ||  || Flavio Fusi Pecci (born 1948) is an Italian astrophysicist who has made major contributions to the study of globular clusters. || 
|-id=157
| 7157 Lofgren ||  || Gary E. Lofgren (born 1941), American planetary scientist and curator of lunar materials at NASA's Johnson Space Center || 
|-id=158
| 7158 IRTF ||  || NASA's Infrared Telescope Facility (IRTF), with its 3-meter telescope on Mauna Kea Observatories, Hawaii. || 
|-id=159
| 7159 Bobjoseph ||  || Robert D. Joseph (born 1939), American astronomer and professor of astronomy at the University of Hawaii. || 
|-id=160
| 7160 Tokunaga ||  || Alan T. Tokunaga (born 1949), American astronomer and a division chief for NASA's Infrared Telescope Facility on Mauna Kea || 
|-id=161
| 7161 Golitsyn ||  || Mikhail Mikhailovich Golitsyn (1675–1730), a Russian field marshal and governor of Finland, who participated in the Azov campaigns (1695–96) and the Great Northern War (1700–1721). || 
|-id=162
| 7162 Sidwell ||  || Daniel R. Sidwell (born 1932), the facility operations manager of the Table Mountain Facility, upon his retirement after 42 years of dedicated service to the Jet Propulsion Laboratory. Sidwell worked with the "wind tunnel" group at JPL's Pasadena facility before moving to Table Mountain in 1976, where he has been a source of dedicated and sustained help beyond the call of duty. Name suggested and citation prepared by J. W. Young || 
|-id=163
| 7163 Barenboim || 1984 DB || Argentinian-born pianist and conductor Daniel Barenboim (born 1942) has been central to bringing classical music to a wide audience. The name was suggested by W. A. Fröger || 
|-id=164
| 7164 Babadzhanov || 1984 ET || Pulat Babadzhanov (born 1930), astronomer and director of the Institute of Astrophysics, Tajik Academy of Sciences, in Dushanbe, Tajikistan. He is an expert in the study of meteors (photography, physics and dynamics), meteoroid streams (evolution), and meteor showers (relation to comets and minor planets). || 
|-id=165
| 7165 Pendleton || 1985 RH || Yvonne Jean Pendleton (born 1957), American astronomer at NASA Ames Research Center, who is a spectroscopist  and expert of organic components found in interstellar dust || 
|-id=166
| 7166 Kennedy || 1985 TR || Malcolm Kennedy (1944–1997), Secretary of the Astronomical Society of Glasgow ‡ ||  
|-id=167
| 7167 Laupheim ||  || Robert Clausen (born 1951) and his team at the Laupheim Observatory in Germany || 
|-id=169
| 7169 Linda ||  || Linda McCartney (1941–1998), wife of Beatle Paul McCartney, member of the musical group Wings, photographer, and author of vegetarian cookbooks. McCartney's strength of purpose as a friend of the environment, of animals, and of all humanity, together with her devotion to her family, provided a shining example to others. Name proposed by the discoverer following a suggestion by J. Dunne, who prepared the citation || 
|-id=170
| 7170 Livesey || 1987 MK || Ron Livesey (born 1929), a Scottish amateur astronomer. He has had a major influence on amateur astronomy, particularly in his native Scotland, and been a key figure in organizing astronomical societies and observational programs, particularly of aurorae.‡ || 
|-id=171
| 7171 Arthurkraus ||  || Baron Artur Kraus (1854–1930), Czech astronomy benefactor and popularizer || 
|-id=172
| 7172 Multatuli ||  || Multatuli, pseudonym of Dutch writer Eduard Douwes Dekker (1820–1887). In 1838 he went to the Dutch East Indies, where he held a number of governmental posts. In 1856 he resigned as assistant commissioner of Lebak, Java, because he was not supported by the government in his struggle to protect the Javanese from exploitation by their own chiefs. Back in Europe, he soon became internationally known with his novel Max Havelaar (1860), which enabled him to plead for justice in Java and to satirize the Dutch middle-class mentality. Name proposed by the discoverer, endorsed by C.-~F. Merks and J. Meeus. || 
|-id=173
| 7173 Sepkoski ||  || Jack Sepkoski (1948–1999), an American palaeontologist whose far-reaching work made a major contribution to quantifying the nature of life's diversity through time. The compilation of a huge database, begun while he was at the University of Rochester and continued at the University of Chicago, enabled researchers to combine mathematical modeling and paleoecology with massive data arrays. Together with his colleague David Raup, Sepkoski developed the theory that catastrophic extinction events have a 26-million-year periodicity. || 
|-id=174
| 7174 Semois || 1988 SQ || Semois river, in Wallonia, flowing from Luxembourg and the Ardennes into the river Meuse || 
|-id=175
| 7175 Janegoodall ||  || Jane Goodall (born 1934) is an English primatologist, ethologist, anthropologist and UN Messenger of Peace. She has dedicated her life to the study of chimpanzees and fighting to save their habitat. Founder of the Jane Goodall Institute in 1977, she has received many honours for her environmental and humanitarian work. || 
|-id=176
| 7176 Kuniji || 1989 XH || Kuniji Saito (born 1913), who joined the Tokyo Astronomical Observatory in 1936 and was engaged mainly in research on the solar corona. Following his retirement in 1974, he has collected historical materials from Japan, China and other countries to analyze them from the viewpoint of modern astronomy, using computers. He named this field of research "paleoastronomy" and hopes that many other researchers will enter into this kind of research. He also served as president of the Astronomical Society of Japan. Name proposed by the discoverers following a suggestion by A. Fujii and A. Tanno || 
|-id=177
| 7177 Melvyntaylor || 1990 TF || Melvyn Douglas Taylor (1947–2017), a British amateur astronomer, promotor of amateur astronomy and mentor to many beginners. His legacy includes a large catalog of visual observations of variable stars, meteors and comets. || 
|-id=178
| 7178 Ikuookamoto ||  || Ikuo Okamoto (born 1946), optician and amateur astronomer. He owns the Schmidt camera with which this minor planet was discovered || 
|-id=179
| 7179 Gassendi ||  || Pierre Gassendi (1592–1655), French philosopher and scientist || 
|-id=182
| 7182 Robinvaughan ||  || Robin M. Vaughan, American engineer, who worked for the Voyager 2, Galileo, Cassini–Huygens and Mars Pathfinder missions and was lead guidance and control system engineer for the MESSENGER spacecraft || 
|-id=186
| 7186 Tomioka || 1991 YF || Hiroyuki Tomioka (born 1942), director of weather information in Hitachi City. An amateur astronomer, he is a charter member of the Nippon Meteor Society and has observed meteors for more than 40 years, both visually and photographically. In addition to his observations from Japan, he often visits the Chiro Observatory Southern Station in Australia to observe southern meteor showers. Name proposed by the discoverers following a suggestion by A. Fujii and T. Sato || 
|-id=187
| 7187 Isobe || 1992 BW || Syuzo Isobe (born 1942), of the National Astronomical Observatory, has been instrumental in establishing the Bisei Spaceguard Center, an observatory designed for the observation of near-earth objects and earth-orbiting space debris. He is also president of the Japan Spaceguard Association || 
|-id=188
| 7188 Yoshii ||  || Koichi Yoshii (born 1914), retired postmaster and amateur astronomer. He was a pioneer in meteor photography in Japan. In the 1930s, when the sensitivity of photographic emulsion was still very low, he succeeded in photographing 86 meteors with his homemade camera. Name proposed by the discoverers following a suggestion by A. Fujii, Y. Yabu and T. Sato || 
|-id=189
| 7189 Kuniko ||  || Kuniko Fujita (1923–1992), née Sofue, amateur astronomer and poet. She became interested in astronomy at an early age and made an important discovery---a nova, later named CP Pup---when she was a 19-year-old schoolgirl; she was awarded a prize from the Japan Astronomical Society as the first discoverer. She became a member of the Kawasaki Astronomical Club in 1972, and she visited Australia and New Zealand in 1986 to observe comet 1P/Halley. She joined expeditions to the Okinawa annular eclipse in 1986 and to the total eclipse in Mexico in 1991. A talented poet and calligrapher, she published a book of poetry, Hoshinagisa. Named by the discoverer following suggestions by S. Morikubo and T. Minowa || 
|-id=192
| 7192 Cieletespace ||  || Ciel et espace (Sky and Space), monthly astronomical magazine edited in Paris by Alain Cirou and published by the Association Française d'Astronomie. || 
|-id=193
| 7193 Yamaoka ||  || Hitoshi Yamaoka (born 1965), astrophysicist at Kyushu University who specializes in the study of supernovae and novae. He promotes a supernova search project at public observatories in Japan || 
|-id=194
| 7194 Susanrose ||  || Susan Rose (born 1952), of East Meadow, New York, is a tireless promoter of astronomy for families and neophytes. For 20 years she has served as the president of the Amateur Observers' Society of New York. In 2002 she received the Walter Scott Houston Award of the Northeast Region of the Astronomical League || 
|-id=195
| 7195 Danboice || 1994 AJ || Daniel Craig Boice (born 1953), American astronomer and expert in cometary science. He was a member of NASA's Deep Space 1 Mission to comet 19P/Borrelly, codiscoverer of a radio flare on Menkar and recipient of the P. Gott Award. He is strongly committed to international scientific collaboration. || 
|-id=196
| 7196 Baroni || 1994 BF || Sandro Baroni (born 1939), an Italian amateur astronomer. He is an observer of variable stars, comets, and occultations, as well as a member of AAVSO (Src) || 
|-id=197
| 7197 Pieroangela || 1994 BH || Piero Angela (1928–2022), Italian journalist and science writer || 
|-id=198
| 7198 Montelupo || 1994 BJ || The Italian town of Montelupo Fiorentino near Florence, where the Montelupo Observatory  is located. || 
|-id=199
| 7199 Brianza || 1994 FR || The Brianza area of Lombardy, and the Gruppo Astrofili Brianza (Brianza Astrophile Group), to which the discoverers belong † || 
|}

7201–7300 

|-
| 7201 Kuritariku ||  || Hiroe Kurimoto (born 1961), a Japanese broadcaster with KOFU-FM, whose radio name is Kuritariku, is an active participant in the Star Week program sponsored by the National Astronomical Observatory of Japan || 
|-id=202
| 7202 Kigoshi ||  || Kunihiko Kigoshi (1919–2014) was a cosmo-geochemist and emeritus professor at Gakushuin University. One of his pioneering works was the development of the radiocarbon dating method, both theoretically and technically. || 
|-id=203
| 7203 Sigeki ||  || Sigeki Horiuchi (born 1949),  a factory manager in the town of Shimosuwa, Nagano prefecture. || 
|-id=204
| 7204 Ondřejov || 1995 GH || Ondřejov, Czech Republic, southeast of Prague and where the Ondřejov Observatory, the country's oldest active observatory, is located || 
|-id=205
| 7205 Sadanori ||  || Sadanori Okamura (born 1948), president of IAU Commission 28 since 2000 || 
|-id=206
| 7206 Shiki || 1996 QT || Masaoka Shiki (1867–1902), a Japanese Haiku poet and author during the Meiji period || 
|-id=207
| 7207 Hammurabi || 2133 P-L || Hammurabi (c. 1810–1750 BCE), King of Babylon || 
|-id=208
| 7208 Ashurbanipal || 2645 P-L || Ashurbanipal (c. 693–626 BCE), King of Assyria || 
|-id=209
| 7209 Cyrus || 3523 P-L || Cyrus II of Persia (c. 600–530 BCE), founder of the Achaemenid Empire || 
|-id=210
| 7210 Darius || 6555 P-L || Darius I of Persia (c. 550–486 BCE) third king of the Achaemenid Empire || 
|-id=211
| 7211 Xerxes || 1240 T-1 || Xerxes I of Persia (518–465 BCE) fourth king of the Achaemenid Empire || 
|-id=212
| 7212 Artaxerxes || 2155 T-2 || Artaxerxes I of Persia (c. 484–424 BCE) fifth King of Persia || 
|-id=213
| 7213 Conae || 1967 KB || CONAE, Comisión Nacional de Actividades Espaciales (Argentinian "National Committee for Space Activities") || 
|-id=214
| 7214 Anticlus ||  || Anticlus, Greek warrior during the Trojan War and one of the Achaeans who hid inside the Trojan Horse. || 
|-id=215
| 7215 Gerhard || 1977 FS || Gerhard Bachmann (1931–1996), head of administration at the organization from 1972 to 1996. || 
|-id=216
| 7216 Ishkov ||  || Vitalij Nikitich Ishkov is a Russian astrophysicist at the Institute of Terrestrial Magnetism, Ionosphere and Radiowave Propagation in Moscow, who works in the fields of solar physics, solar activity and solar-terrestrial relations. || 
|-id=217
| 7217 Dacke ||  || Nils Dacke (died 1543), Swedish  leader of the medieval peasant revolt known as Dacke War || 
|-id=218
| 7218 Skácel || 1979 SK || Jan Skácel (1922–1989), Czech poet of South Moravian origin, was one of the most beloved Czech poets of the last century. He wrote about human life, love, morals, dreams and nature in poems or just quatrains, as Hope with Wings of Beech shows. Skácel was awarded the German international literary Petrarca-Preis in 1989. || 
|-id=219
| 7219 Satterwhite ||  || Cecilia Satterwhite (born 1958), American curator of meteorites at NASA's Johnson Space Center. || 
|-id=220
| 7220 Philnicholson || 1981 QE || Phil Nicholson (born 1951), a professor of astronomy at Cornell University, an Australian by birth. Nicholson's research centers on the orbital dynamics of planetary ring systems and natural satellites, and infrared observational studies of planets, their satellites and rings. He has also investigated the dynamics of a planetary system around the pulsar PSR B1257+12 and has studied the zodiacal dust bands. Nicholson is co-discoverer of two irregular satellites of Uranus (XVII) and the trans-Neptunian object . He is currently editor of the journal Icarus, which is devoted to planetary science. || 
|-id=221
| 7221 Sallaba || 1981 SJ || Jan Sallaba (1775–1827) was the builder and, from 1821, chief construction manager of the Schwarzenberg court in Cesky Krumlov. || 
|-id=222
| 7222 Alekperov ||  || Vagit Yusupovich Alikperov (born 1950) is known for his development of economical foundations and organizational principles for oil companies. His ideas were used by Lukoil, one of the largest international oil companies. He is also an active sponsor of science and culture in Russia. || 
|-id=223
| 7223 Dolgorukij ||  || Yuri Dolgorukiy (c. 1095–1157), son of Vladimir II Monomakh who both reigned as Grand Prince of Kievan Rus || 
|-id=224
| 7224 Vesnina ||  || Leonid Vesnin (1880–1933), Viktor Vesnin (1882–1950), and Alexander Vesnin (1883–1959), Russian architects || 
|-id=225
| 7225 Huntress || 1983 BH || Wesley T. Huntress Jr. (born 1942), an American planetary cosmochemist and director of NASA space science programs during the 1990s. Gaining international recognition for pioneering studies of chemical evolution in interstellar clouds, comets and planetary atmospheres, Huntress was instrumental in developing the astrochemical research group at the Jet Propulsion Laboratory. During his six years as NASA Associate Administrator for Space Science, the rate at which science missions were launched increased dramatically, along with the public awareness of space science. The naming honors Huntress on his departure from NASA after an illustrious 29-year career with the agency. Name proposed by the discoverer following a suggestion by M. S. Allen, who prepared the citation. || 
|-id=226
| 7226 Kryl || 1984 QJ || Karel Kryl (1944–1994), Czech singer and songwriter, from 1969 a resident of Germany working at Radio Free Europe. His songs were appreciated as a symbol of freedom by many people in the former Czechoslovakia. Name suggested by J. Ticha and M. Tichy. || 
|-id=228
| 7228 MacGillivray || 1985 GO || Sally M. MacGillivray of Sky Publishing Corporation. With an early bent for music and philosophy, followed by 20 years' experience in book publishing, she brought to the Millennium Star Atlas (1997). As publication manager of this collaborative venture with the European Space Agency's Hipparcos project, she orchestrated the many iterations by two teams of illustrators needed to complete the 1548 charts in the atlas. || 
|-id=229
| 7229 Tonimoore || 1985 RV || Toni L. Moore, who has worked at the University of Arizona's Lunar and Planetary Laboratory since 1986 as an observer, programmer and data analyst on radial velocity observations of stars. She has devoted thousands of hours of observations to a search for planets orbiting other stars, a study of the stability of the solar spectrum and a unique investigation of p -mode oscillations in a star other than the Sun. || 
|-id=230
| 7230 Lutz ||  || Barry L. Lutz (born 1944), professor of physics and astronomy and currently department chair at Northern Arizona University. || 
|-id=231
| 7231 Porco ||  || Carolyn C. Porco (born 1954), an American planetary scientist at the University of Arizona. A pioneer in the study of planetary ring systems, Porco has made important contributions to our knowledge of spokes in Saturn's rings, eccentric ring features in the systems of Saturn and Uranus and the azimuthal structure in the rings of Neptune. Through her contributions to the Voyager project and as the team leader for the Cassini imaging system, Porco has been a leader in spacecraft exploration of the outer solar system. In 1997, she originated the idea of sending a capsule containing ashes of E. M. Shoemaker to the moon aboard the Lunar Prospector spacecraft. Name endorsed by the Shoemaker family. || 
|-id=232
| 7232 Nabokov || 1985 UQ || Vladimir Nabokov (1899–1977) was a Russian-American novelist, poet and critic. His best works, including Lolita (1955), feature stylish, intricate literary effects. The name was suggested by J. Ticha. || 
|-id=233
| 7233 Majella ||  || Majella National Park (Parco Nazionale della Majella) a large and well preserved natural reserve in Abruzzo, Italy || 
|-id=235
| 7235 Hitsuzan || 1986 UY || Hitsuzan, mountain in Kochi, Japan. || 
|-id=237
| 7237 Vickyhamilton || 1988 VH || Victoria Hamilton (born 1971), American planetary mineralogist || 
|-id=238
| 7238 Kobori || 1989 OA || Akira Kobori (1904–1992), professor of mathematics at Kyoto University and president of the Kyoto prefectural university. He contributed to the study of multivalent functions and history of mathematics. || 
|-id=239
| 7239 Mobberley || 1989 TE || Martin Mobberley (born 1958), British amateur astronomer and author  † || 
|-id=240
| 7240 Hasebe || 1989 YG || Takao Hasebe (born 1947) is a Japanese amateur astronomer who taught astronomy to the first discoverer during his youth. Hasebe is also an observer of the lunar surface || 
|-id=241
| 7241 Kuroda ||  || Takehiko Kuroda (born 1946), since 1990 the first director of the Nishi-Harima Astronomical Observatory (NHAO) and one of the leading astronomers in Japanese public observatories. || 
|-id=242
| 7242 Okyudo ||  || Masami Okyudo (born 1961), Japanese astronomer and currently director of the Misato Observatory, Wakayama Prefecture. || 
|-id=244
| 7244 Villa-Lobos ||  || Heitor Villa-Lobos (1887–1959), Brazilian composer || 
|-id=247
| 7247 Robertstirling ||  || Robert Stirling (1790–1878), a Scottish inventor. || 
|-id=248
| 7248 Älvsjö ||  || Älvsjö, Sweden, now a residential suburb of Stockholm, is the location of the Battle of Brännkyrka  (1518), in which the young king-to-be Gustaf Vasa participated. More than a thousand lives were lost, and many streets of Älvsjö bear the names of men killed in the battle. || 
|-id=250
| 7250 Kinoshita ||  || Hiroshi Kinoshita (born 1941), a celestial mechanician at the National Astronomical Observatory (formerly known as the Tokyo Astronomical Observatory). || 
|-id=251
| 7251 Kuwabara ||  || Syoji Kuwabara (born 1927), a retired school teacher in Japan, he was superintendent of the board of education in Himeji City (1981–1993) and director of the city's Science Museum (1993–1996). || 
|-id=252
| 7252 Kakegawa || 1992 UZ || Kakegawa, an ancient city in central Japan famous for the wooden castle. || 
|-id=253
| 7253 Nara || 1993 CL || The Japanese Nara Prefecture with its capital city of Nara || 
|-id=254
| 7254 Kuratani ||  || Hiroshi Kuratani (born 1934), astronomer and educator at Toyama Observatory since 1956 || 
|-id=256
| 7256 Bonhoeffer ||  || Dietrich Bonhoeffer (1906–1945), German theologian and opponent of Nazism, executed in 1945 following his arrest and imprisonment after the attempt to assassinate Hitler. His brother Klaus was amongst those arrested and executed. || 
|-id=257
| 7257 Yoshiya ||  || Yoshiya Watanabe (born 1968), science educator and planetarian of the Osaka Science Museum || 
|-id=258
| 7258 Pettarin || 1994 EF || Enrico Pettarin (born 1970), Italian amateur astronomer || 
|-id=259
| 7259 Gaithersburg ||  || Gaithersburg, Maryland, is a city to the north of Washington, D.C. || 
|-id=260
| 7260 Metelli || 1994 FN || Orneore Metelli (1872–1938), internationally acknowledged as the founder of the school of naïve painting. || 
|-id=261
| 7261 Yokootakeo || 1994 GZ || Takeo Yokoo (born 1939), of Osaka Kyoiku University, mainly studies galactic astronomy. He also served as president of the Society for Teaching and Popularization of Astronomy in Japan from 1998 to 2002. || 
|-id=262
| 7262 Sofue ||  || Yoshiaki Sofue (born 1943), works mainly in galactic radio astronomy, playing a leading role in millimeter-wave research of galaxies in Japan. He has determined high-accuracy central rotation curves and detailed mass distributions and has shown the general existence of massive cores. || 
|-id=263
| 7263 Takayamada || 1995 DP || Takashi Yamada (born 1934), a science educator and the former planetarium director of the Nogoya City Science Museum || 
|-id=264
| 7264 Hirohatanaka || 1995 FK || Hiroshi Hatanaka (born 1947), a Japanese amateur astronomer || 
|-id=265
| 7265 Edithmüller || 2908 T-2 || Edith Alice Müller (1918–1995), Swiss astronomer. IAU General Secretary from 1976 to 1979. || 
|-id=266
| 7266 Trefftz || 4270 T-2 || Eleonore Trefftz (1920–2017), German physicist at the Max Planck Institute for Physics and Astrophysics || 
|-id=267
| 7267 Victormeen || 1943 DF || Victor Ben Meen (1910–1971), Canadian mineralogist and geologist, who was the first to  identify the Pingualuit crater in northern Quebec as an impact structure in 1950 † || 
|-id=268
| 7268 Chigorin || 1972 TF || Mikhail Chigorin (1850–1908), founder of the Russian chess school || 
|-id=269
| 7269 Alprokhorov ||  || Alexander Prokhorov (1916–2002), Russian physicist and 1964 Nobel laureate for fundamental research in quantum electronics that led to the creation of masers and lasers.
|-id=270
| 7270 Punkin ||  || Erica Ann Broman, donor to the Lowell Observatory || 
|-id=271
| 7271 Doroguntsov ||  || Sergej Ivanovich Doroguntsov (born 1929), corresponding member of the National Academy of Sciences of Ukraine, is prominent in the study of economics and ecology, head of a faculty at Kiev National Economic University and president of the Ukrainian Ecological Academy of Sciences || 
|-id=272
| 7272 Darbydyar ||  || M. Darby Dyar (born 1958), American astronomy professor and planetologist at Mount Holyoke College || 
|-id=273
| 7273 Garyhuss ||  || Gary R. Huss (born 1954), American cosmochemist, director of the W. M. Keck Cosmochemistry Laboratory at the University of Hawaii || 
|-id=274
| 7274 Washioyama || 1982 FC || Washioyama, mountain in Kochi, Japan. || 
|-id=275
| 7275 Earlcarpenter ||  || Earl Carpenter (born 1934) taught physics to thousands of students over the course of 35 years at Salesianum High School in Wilmington, Delaware where he inspired them to rely on their own problem-solving skills. || 
|-id=276
| 7276 Maymie || 1983 RE || Marion R. Aymie, a manager of the Human Resources Department at the Smithsonian Astrophysical Observatory in Cambridge, Massachusetts || 
|-id=277
| 7277 Klass ||  || Philip J. Klass (1919–2005), prominent UFO skeptic [Skeptical Inquirer, Vol. 29, No. 6, Nov/Dec 2005, p. 18] || 
|-id=278
| 7278 Shtokolov ||  || Boris Shtokolov (1930–2005), is a Russian singer, actor and bass soloist for the Mariinskij Theatre in St Petersburg || 
|-id=279
| 7279 Hagfors ||  || Tor Hagfors (born 1930), in celebration of his 68th birthday and his retirement as director of the Max-Planck-Institut für Aeronomie. || 
|-id=280
| 7280 Bergengruen ||  || Werner Bergengruen (1892–1964), a Baltic German novelist and poet || 
|-id=285
| 7285 Seggewiss ||  || Wilhelm Seggewiss (born 1937), German astronomer and head of the Hoher List Observatory || 
|-id=287
| 7287 Yokokurayama ||  || Yokokurayama, mountain in Kochi, Japan. || 
|-id=289
| 7289 Kamegamori || 1991 JU || Kamegamori, a grassy mountain in the center of the mountainous region of Shikoku Island. || 
|-id=290
| 7290 Johnrather ||  || John Daniel Gray Rather (born 1938), American astrophysicist and head of the Near-Earth Object Interception Committee || 
|-id=291
| 7291 Hyakutake ||  || Yuji Hyakutake (1950–2002), Japanese astronomer and discoverer of comet Hyakutake || 
|-id=292
| 7292 Prosperin ||  || Erik Prosperin (1739–1803), Swedish astronomer || 
|-id=293
| 7293 Kazuyuki || 1992 FH || Kazuyuki Saitoh (born 1957), associate director of the Nichihara Observatory since 1985 and president of the Shimane Society of Astronomy, Shimane Prefecture. || 
|-id=294
| 7294 Barbaraakey || 1992 LM || Barbara Ann (Akey) Leonard (born 1968), wife of American discoverer Gregory J. Leonard || 
|-id=295
| 7295 Brozovic || 1992 MB || Marina Brozovic (born 1971), an American scientist at JPL, uses the Goldstone and Arecibo radars to observe near-earth objects and then derives radar shape models and rotation states for these objects || 
|-id=296
| 7296 Lamarck ||  || Jean-Baptiste Lamarck (1744–1829), French naturalist || 
|-id=298
| 7298 Matudaira-gou ||  || Matudaira-gou is located in the east of Toyota city, Aichi prefecture. It is the motherland of the Tokugawa Shōgun family, who ruled Japan during 1603–1867 || 
|-id=299
| 7299 Indiawadkins ||  || India Wadkins (1947–1999), long-time secretary to the Planetary Society † || 
|-id=300
| 7300 Yoshisada ||  || Yoshisada Shimizu (born 1943), a Japanese amateur astronomer, astrophotographer, and discoverer of minor planets || 
|}

7301–7400 

|-
| 7301 Matsuitakafumi || 1993 AB || Takafumi Matsui (born 1946) is Director of the Planetary Exploration Research Center at the Chiba Institute of Technology, and Emeritus Professor at the University of Tokyo. He specializes in astrobiology and comparative planetology, and the study of meteoroid impacts on the evolution of the Earth and life || 
|-id=304
| 7304 Namiki ||  || Namiki Mitsuo (born 1957) is a Japanese amateur astronomer on the staff of the public-information office of the National Astronomical Observatory. He acts as a bridge between Japanese professionals and amateurs and helps create friendly relationships || 
|-id=305
| 7305 Ossakajusto ||  || Justo Ossaka (1922–1998), emeritus director of the Sendai Astronomical Observatory. Graduating from the Geophysical Institute, Tohoku University, in 1950, he worked at the Sendai Observatory from 1956 to 1994. He contributed greatly to attracting amateur astronomers and planetarium visitors. Name proposed by A. Watanabe and M. Koishikawa of the Sendai Astronomical Observatory || 
|-id=306
| 7306 Panizon || 1994 EH || Franco Panizon (born 1925). Head of the pediatric department of the University of Trieste, he is one of the key figures in Italian pediatrics, endowed with a deep knowledge of all scientific disciplines focusing on human beings, a true master of science and life. From Trieste he has influenced pediatricians all over the country and has founded a pediatric school that teaches care for children through mind and heart || 
|-id=307
| 7307 Takei || 1994 EH || George Takei (born 1937), an actor best known for his role as Mr. Sulu in the original Star Trek television series. He also has a lengthy record of public service through his involvement with organizations such as the Japanese American Citizens League and the Human Rights Campaign. || 
|-id=308
| 7308 Hattori ||  || Tadahiko Hattori (1908–1962), a Japanese astronomer at the Tokyo Astronomical Observatory and International Latitude Observatory who became the first director of the International Polar Motion Service shortly before his death. || 
|-id=309
| 7309 Shinkawakami || 1995 FU || Shin-ichi Kawakami (born 1956) is a professor of Earth and Planetary Sciences in the Faculty of Education at Gifu University. He has studied impact cratering and its implications for planetary evolution. He also published several books on the history of Planet Earth || 
|-id=311
| 7311 Hildehan || 1995 TU || Forever outnumbered by the women in his life, the discoverer chose to acknowledge those most significant with an appellation formed by letters in the names of his mother, Edith (Johnson) di Cicco (1912–1994); wife, Hilary F. Bennett (born 1952); and daughter, Hannah di Cicco (born 1987) || 
|-id=313
| 7313 Pisano || 6207 P-L || Family of Italian sculptors: Nicola Pisano (c. 1225–1280), Giovanni Pisano (c. 1250–1315), and Andrea Pisano (c. 1290–1348) || 
|-id=314
| 7314 Pevsner || 2146 T-1 || Antoine Pevsner (1886–1962), Russian-born French sculptor and painter. || 
|-id=315
| 7315 Kolbe || 1136 T-2 || Georg Kolbe (1877–1947), a German sculptor || 
|-id=316
| 7316 Hajdu || 3145 T-2 || Étienne Hajdú (1907–1996), Hungarian-born French sculptor || 
|-id=317
| 7317 Cabot || 1940 ED || John Cabot (c. 1450–1500), an Italian (Genoese-Venetian) navigator and explorer. || 
|-id=318
| 7318 Dyukov || 1969 OX || Vitalij Petrovich Dyukov (born 1945), a professor at the Siberian State Geodesy Academy in Novosibirsk, is a specialist on the earth's gravitational field and author of more than ten textbooks for students || 
|-id=319
| 7319 Katterfeld ||  || Gennadij Nikolaevich Katterfeld (born 1927), a Russian geologist and planetologist in Saint Petersburg. || 
|-id=320
| 7320 Potter ||  || Kheino Potter (1929–2007), astronomer at Pulkovo Observatory, known for his work on the determination of astronomical constants and the problems of selenodesy. He was initiator of and an active contributor to FOCAT, the reference catalog for the southern sky, and he organized the observational station at Ordubad. || 
|-id=321
| 7321 Minervahoyt ||  || Minerva Hamilton Hoyt (1866–1945) was an American activist. She advocated for desert regions and plants, educating people across the nation. Thanks to her efforts, California created Joshua Tree, Death Valley, and Anza-Borrego Desert parks. Over 2.5 million people now visit the Joshua Tree park each year. || 
|-id=322
| 7322 Lavrentina ||  || Soviet mathematician Mikhail Alekseevich Lavrent'ev (1900–1980) was the first head of the Siberian Department of the U.S.S.R. Academy of Sciences. His son Mikhail Mikhailovich Lavrent'ev (born 1932) also works in mathematical physics || 
|-id=323
| 7323 Robersomma ||  || Roberto Somma (born 1944), an Italian space engineer at Alenia Spazio, has promoted ideas and organized international meetings in Italy on the exploration of the solar system, in particular of near-earth objects || 
|-id=324
| 7324 Carret || 1981 BC || Philip L. Carret (1896–1998), American investor and creator of the Pioneer Fund || 
|-id=326
| 7326 Tedbunch ||  || Theodore E. Bunch (born 1936) is an American meteoriticist at Northern Arizona University. He has used petrologic studies of a broad array of meteorites to understand the metamorphism and differentiation of minor planets and the Moon. || 
|-id=327
| 7327 Crawford ||  || David L. Crawford (born 1931), astronomer at the Kitt Peak National Observatory recognized for his fundamental contributions to protecting dark skies around observatories from light pollution through good outdoor lighting practices. In 1972 he was instrumental in establishing the first comprehensive lighting code, which regulated outdoor lighting in southern Arizona, and the code has become a model for such regulation throughout the world. Crawford was cofounder and executive director of the International Dark-Sky Association, a worldwide organization dedicated to the preservation of dark skies. He was also responsible for establishing the fundamental standards of the Strömgren photometric system. Name suggested and citation provided by D. R. Davis || 
|-id=328
| 7328 Casanova ||  || Giacomo Casanova (1725–1798) was an Italian writer, spy and diplomat, the prince of Italian adventurers. His autobiography Histoire de ma vie established his reputation as an archetypal seducer of women. He spent his final years in Bohemia as librarian in the château of Dux, now Duchcov. The name was suggested by M. Tichy. || 
|-id=329
| 7329 Bettadotto || 1985 GK || Elisabetta Dotto (born 1965), Italian planetary scientist. Dotto studied the rotational properties of a large number of minor planets by carrying out accurate photometric observations. She assisted the Galileo mission fly-by of (243) Ida by determining the spin vector and a reference shape using ground-based observations, and she contributed to the ISO mission by interpreting infrared observations. Name suggested and citation prepared by M. A. Barucci and M. Fulchignoni. || 
|-id=330
| 7330 Annelemaître || 1985 TD || Anne Lemaître (born 1957) a Belgian mathematician, for her pioneering analytic studies of the dynamics of minor planets in mean-motion resonances. She has also investigated the process of adiabatic capture into resonance, and has computed accurate proper elements for objects with large orbital eccentricities and inclinations. Name suggested and citation provided by A. Morbidelli. || 
|-id=331
| 7331 Balindblad || 1985 TV || Bertil Lindblad (born 1921), Swedish astronomer of the Lund Observatory, in recognition of his lifetime work on meteor orbits; his long-term effort in establishing a database for all meteor orbits, now generally used by all meteor workers; his stewardship of IAU Commission 22, which he served as president in the early 1970s; and, in particular, his contribution to starting the very successful "Asteroids, Comets, Meteors" series of conferences. Name suggested and citation written by I. P. Williams. || 
|-id=332
| 7332 Ponrepo ||  || Viktor Ponrepo (1858–1926), a Czech cinematic pioneer who was the founder of the first permanent cinema in Prague in 1907. The name was suggested by M. Tichy. || 
|-id=333
| 7333 Bec-Borsenberger ||  || Annick Bec-Borsenberger (born 1940), a French astronomer at the Bureau des Longitudes, Institut de Mécanique Céleste de l'Observatoire de Paris. She is known for her analytical theory of the motion of the Moon. She is an expert in the dynamics of small bodies, particularly in the convergence of algorithms used to determine perturbed orbits. She helped analyze Hipparcos data on minor planets and satellites and has been involved in the ISO mission. Citation provided by M. A. Barucci. || 
|-id=334
| 7334 Sciurus || 1988 QV || Sciurus, a genus of bushy-tailed squirrels. Sciurus vulgaris and Sciurus carolinensis are squirrels, animals that live mainly in the tops of trees in parks and forests around many observatories, including Klet and the České Budějovice Observatory. The name was suggested by J. Ticha. || 
|-id=336
| 7336 Saunders ||  || R. Stephen Saunders (born 1940), chief scientist for the Solar System Exploration Office at the Jet Propulsion Laboratory, is the project scientist for the Mars Surveyor Program 2001/2003 mission, director of JPL's Regional Planetary Image Facility and former project scientist of the Magellan mission to Venus || 
|-id=342
| 7342 Uchinoura ||  || Uchinoura, a former Japanese town located in the Kimotsuki District of Kagoshima Prefecture, where the Kagoshima Space Center of the Institute of Space and Astronautical Science (ISAS) is located. A small fishing village, the town entered the limelight in 1962, when it was selected as the launching site for ISAS (now ISAS Ministry of Education, Science, Sports and Culture). ISAS satellites are launched toward the Pacific Ocean from a plateau in the southeastern part of the town. The facilities are getting larger as the rockets also grow in size. The usual population of the town is about 10,000, but at the time of a launch staff and reporters typically cause a 20-percent increase. || 
|-id=343
| 7343 Ockeghem ||  || Johannes Ockeghem (1420–1497), a Flemish composer || 
|-id=344
| 7344 Summerfield || 1992 LU || Robert and Lisa Summerfield, American popularizers of astronomy and found of the "Astronomy To Go" organization || 
|-id=345
| 7345 Happer || 1992 OF || Felix Happer, the character played by Burt Lancaster in the movie Local Hero || 
|-id=346
| 7346 Boulanger ||  || Nicolas Antoine Boulanger (1722–1759), a French geologist and one of the Encyclopedists, believed that the irrational behavior of the human species, together with all the heritage of religious rites and much of the political of his own and other ages, were engendered in cataclysmic experiences. || 
|-id=349
| 7349 Ernestmaes ||  || Ernest Maes (born 1915), a doctor of medicine (dermatology), has long had a great interest in anthropology, history of religion and psychiatry, resulting in several books on the critical evaluation of religious tradition || 
|-id=351
| 7351 Yoshidamichi ||  || Michitoshi Yoshida (born 1963) is the director of Okayama Astrophysical Observatory, a branch of the National Astronomical Observatory of Japan. His main interests are extragalactic astronomy, especially observational study of active galaxies, and astronomical instrumentation || 
|-id=352
| 7352 Hypsenor || 1994 CO || Hypsenor, son of Hippasus from Greek mythology. During the Trojan War, Deiphobus attempted to strike Idomeneus after latter killed Asius, but his spear throw bounced off Idomeneus' shield and killed Hypsenor instead. || 
|-id=353
| 7353 Kazuya ||  || Kazuya Yoshida (born 1960). An authority in robot engineering at Tohoku University, Yoshida is now developing a robotic system to explore the minor planets. He is an excellent astrophotographer and a member of Mt. Nyukasa Station, where this minor planet was discovered || 
|-id=354
| 7354 Ishiguro ||  || Masato Ishiguro (born 1945) has been the Japanese project director of the ALMA (Atacama Large Millimeter/submillimeter Array) project since 1998. He was in charge of constructing the Nobeyama Millimeter Array and was the director of the Nobeyama Radio Observatory from 1990 to 1996. || 
|-id=355
| 7355 Bottke ||  || William F. Bottke Jr. (born 1966), a planetary scientist known for his research on the collisional and dynamical evolution of minor planets. He has also contributed to the study of the origin and evolution of NEAs, in particular by analyzing the formation of doublet craters found on the terrestrial planets. || 
|-id=356
| 7356 Casagrande ||  || Alessandro Casagrande (1922–1964). Composer and orchestra conductor, he skillfully headed the music school in Terni and served as artistic manager of the city's symphonic bureau "S. Falchi". He was also a painter. In 1965 an international piano competition was named for him || 
|-id=358
| 7358 Oze ||  || Oze is a basin highland lying astride the prefectures Fukushima, Gunma and Niigata. The highland is surrounded by mountains, including Mt. Hiuchidake and Mt. Shifutsu, making up the western part of the Nikkō National Park || 
|-id=359
| 7359 Messier || 1996 BH || Charles Messier (1730–1817), French astronomer best known for his Messier objects || 
|-id=360
| 7360 Moberg ||  || Vilhelm Moberg (1898–1973), a Swedish novelist and writer. Moberg mainly wrote about society's lower classes and always fought for the individual against the authorities. He also strove unsuccessfully to make Sweden a republic. Among his best-known novels are Utvandrarna ("The Emigrants") and Invandrarna ("The Immigrants"), about a family moving from Småland to Minnesota during the nineteenth century. || 
|-id=361
| 7361 Endres ||  || Michael Hart Endres, American site manager of the GEODSS project and involved in the setup of the Near-Earth Asteroid Tracking program || 
|-id=362
| 7362 Rogerbyrd || 1996 EY || Roger Byrd, experienced U.S. project manager involved in the GEODSS and NEAT programs || 
|-id=363
| 7363 Esquibel ||  || Albert Esquibel, experienced U.S. project manager involved in the GEODSS and NEAT programs || 
|-id=364
| 7364 Otonkučera || 1996 KS || Oton Kučera, founder of Zagreb Observatory, Croatia || 
|-id=365
| 7365 Sejong ||  || King Sejong (1397–1450) was the fourth Korean king of Joseon-dynasty, who built the Royal Observatory of Choson || 
|-id=366
| 7366 Agata || 1996 UY || Hidehiko Agata (born 1961) is a staff member in the public information office of the National Astronomical Observatory of Japan. His main interests are education and populiarization of astronomy, and he has published many books on elementary astronomy. He has also studied cometary plasma tails || 
|-id=367
| 7367 Giotto || 3077 T-1 || Giotto di Bondone (c. 1266–1337), Italian painter and architect || 
|-id=368
| 7368 Haldancohn || 1966 BB || Haldan Cohn (born 1953), on the faculty of Indiana University, has carried out fundamental research on the dynamics of stellar systems. He is particularly known for his work on the late stages of core collapse in star clusters and on the effect of gravothermal instabilities on the dynamical evolution of star clusters || 
|-id=369
| 7369 Gavrilin || 1975 AN || Valery Gavrilin (1939–1999) was an outstanding Russian composer whose compositions have become a national property of Russia and occupy a well-deserved place in the culture of the twentieth century. The name was suggested by the Union of Concert Workers of Russia. || 
|-id=370
| 7370 Krasnogolovets ||  || Mikhail Aleksandrovich Krasnogolovets (born 1960), professor of radioelectronics at Kharkov National Technical University, specializes in the physics of elementary particles, accelerators and lasers. He is known in particular for his work on a high-energy laser for astrophysical research || 
|-id=371
| 7371 El-Baz ||  || Farouk El-Baz (born 1938) is an Egyptian American remote sensing expert. He is perhaps best known for using his expertise to help select the landing site for the Apollo 11 astronauts. He also trained the Apollo 15 astronauts in geology, ensuring that the most scientifically useful samples were gathered for return to Earth. || 
|-id=372
| 7372 Emimar || 1979 HH || Geophysicist María Emilia Muzzio (born 1979) and anthropologist Marina Muzzio (born 1982) are two Argentine scientists, daughters of the discoverer || 
|-id=373
| 7373 Stashis ||  || Vladimir Vladimirovich Stashis (born 1925) is a Ukrainian scholar of jurisprudence, vice-rector of the Ukrainian National Academy of Law and a member of the International Court of the United Nations. He also likes poetry and art and has a large collection of pictures of classical Russian painters || 
|-id=376
| 7376 Jefftaylor ||  || G. Jeffrey Taylor (born 1944) is an American professor of planetary science at the University of Hawaii. His merging of data on lunar and meteorite petrology with remotely-sensed data from planetary missions has unlocked vital clues to the earliest evolution of planetary bodies, particularly the moon. || 
|-id=377
| 7377 Pizzarello ||  || Sandra Pizzarello (born 1933), an Italian chemist and professor of chemistry at Arizona State University. Along with colleagues, she has pioneered the study of organic material in meteorites. || 
|-id=378
| 7378 Herbertpalme ||  || Herbert Palme (born 1943) a German geochemist and professor at the Institute of Mineralogy and Geochemistry, University of Cologne. He is a geochemist interested in all aspects of meteoritics and planetary science, with an emphasis on understanding the origin of components in chondritic meteorites. || 
|-id=379
| 7379 Naoyaimae ||  || Naoya Imae (born 1964) is a curator at the National Institute of Polar Research in Tokyo, whose petrologic studies of carbonaceous chondrites and martian meteorites have focused on understanding the processes of aqueous alteration on minor planets and igneous differentiation on Mars. || 
|-id=381
| 7381 Mamontov ||  || Savva Mamontov (1841–1918), Russian patron of the arts || 
|-id=382
| 7382 Bozhenkova ||  || Margarita Ivanovna Bozhenkova (born 1941), a Russian writer and member of the Writers' Union of Russia, vice-president of the Writers' Naval Association in St. Petersburg and laureate of the "Gold Pen" prize || 
|-id=383
| 7383 Lassovszky || 1981 SE || Károly Lassovszky (1897–1961), Hungarian astronomer (Src Src) || 
|-id=385
| 7385 Aktsynovia ||  || Lyudmila Mikhailovna Aktsynova (1910–1997) and her husband Arkadij Vsevolodovich Aktsynov (1910–1997) were masters of portraiture and landscape painting. They depicted the beauties of nature in various parts of Russia, including Siberia, Baikal, Sayany, Altaj and Volga || 
|-id=386
| 7386 Paulpellas || 1981 WM || Paul Pellas (1924–1997), French meteoriticist and curator at the Muséum d'Histoire Naturelle in Paris || 
|-id=387
| 7387 Malbil ||  || Malcolm Bilson (born 1935), an American pianist and Professor of Music at Cornell University who has recorded scintillating performances of music by Mozart, Beethoven and others. His research interests center on music of the late eigteenth and nineteenth centuries, performance practice, problems of notation and execution, instruments and musical aesthetics. He has won several awards. Bilson gave a recital at the "Asteroids, Comets, Meteors" meeting at Cornell University in July 1999., American pianist || 
|-id=388
| 7388 Marcomorelli ||  || Marco Morelli (born 1973), a planetary geologist and a specialist in terrestrial impact structures and meteorites. || 
|-id=389
| 7389 Michelcombes || 1982 UE || Michel André Combes (born 1939), French planetary scientist and president of the Paris Observatory from 1992 to 1998. Combes studied planetary atmospheres using infrared observations carried out both from the ground and from space. He has been particularly active in designing and building new-technology instruments for spacecraft (for example, an infrared spectrometer for the Vega mission to comet 1P/Halley) and for the largest ground-based telescopes (such as the adaptive optics device Come-on). Combes has played an important role in developing planetary science in France, particularly by encouraging his younger colleagues to join international efforts in planetary space exploration. Name suggested and citation prepared by M. Fulchignoni. || 
|-id=390
| 7390 Kundera || 1983 QE || Milan Kundera (born 1929), Czech novelist, playwright and poet. He has written various works combining the comedy of living with political criticism. His novel The Unbearable Lightness of Being is well known and received wide international exposure as a very successful movie. Since 1975 he has lived in France. Name proposed by J. Ticha following a suggestion by M. Šidlichovský. || 
|-id=391
| 7391 Strouhal ||  || Vincenc Strouhal (1850–1922), Czech physicist and professor of experimental physics. He founded and built up the Institute of Physics of the Czech part of Charles University (1907). Name suggested by J. Ticha and M. Šolc. || 
|-id=392
| 7392 Kowalski || 1984 EX || Richard Kowalski (born 1963), an American amateur astronomer and discoverer of minor planets of Quail Hollow Observatory, near Tampa, Florida. Kowalski is engaged in follow-up and discovery work on minor planets and comets. In 1998 he founded and has energetically maintained the Minor Planet Mailing List, a web-based information service and chat group for amateur and professional observers. Kowalski has also been the main organizer of the 1999 Amateur-Professional Minor Planet Workshop at the Lowell Observatory. Citation written by the discoverer and P. G. Comba. || 
|-id=393
| 7393 Luginbuhl ||  || Christian B. Luginbuhl (born 1955), American astronomer and discoverer of minor planets of the U.S. Naval Observatory's Flagstaff Station, is largely responsible for the enactment and continued enforcement of ordinances preserving the dark skies of northern Arizona. With the discoverer, he co-authored the Observing Handbook and Catalogue of Deep-Sky Objects. || 
|-id=394
| 7394 Xanthomalitia ||  || Leonid Vasil'evich Xanthomaliti (Ksanfomaliti; born 1932), radiometrist, photo-metrist, polarimetrist and altimetrist, discovered the Martian "anti-greenhouse" effect, hypothesized on the thunderbolt phenomena in Venus' atmosphere and predicted high volcanic activity on Venus. The name was suggested by V. K. Abalakin || 
|-id=396
| 7396 Brusin ||  || Silvia Rosa Brusin, head of one of the principal Italian scientific programs. She is strongly involved in popular astronomy and is in close contact with scientists around the world. Her programs on Italian television constitute a serious reference for interested people || 
|-id=398
| 7398 Walsh || 1986 VM || Martin F. Walsh, friend of the discoverer || 
|-id=399
| 7399 Somme ||  || The Somme is a river in Northern France in the département of Picardie. The Celtic name means `tranquility'. With a length of nearly 250 km and a source near the city of St. Quentin, the Somme forms an extensive and beautiful bay, rich in flora and fauna, as it enters the English Channel || 
|-id=400
| 7400 Lenau ||  || Nikolaus Lenau (1802–1850), an Austrian poet, whose Faust was the inspiration of Liszt's Mephisto Walzer || 
|}

7401–7500 

|-
| 7401 Toynbee ||  || Arnold J. Toynbee (1934–1961), a British historian, who analyzed the rise and fall of civilizations in his twelve-volume work A Study of History (1934–1961) || 
|-id=403
| 7403 Choustník ||  || Choustník, castle in Czech Republic || 
|-id=408
| 7408 Yoshihide || 1989 SB || Yoshihide Hayashi (born 1959), a Japanese  amateur astronomer who works as a curator at a science museum. He contributes himself as a volunteer to the educational organization Fukorounokai and serves to popularize astronomy among the citizens. || 
|-id=410
| 7410 Kawazoe || 1990 QG || Akira Kawazoe (born 1934), a member of the Geisei Observatory staff with particular interests in meteorites and geology. || 
|-id=412
| 7412 Linnaeus ||  || Carl Linnaeus (Carl von Linné; 1707–1778), Swedish naturalist || 
|-id=413
| 7413 Galibina ||  || Irina Vladimirovna Galibina (born 1929), a celestial mechanician. || 
|-id=414
| 7414 Bosch ||  || Carl Bosch (1874–1940), a German chemist, inventor of high-pressure ammonia synthesis, 1931 Nobel laureate in chemistry and enthusiastic amateur astronomer. During the 1920s he built a well-equipped private observatory on his estate at Heidelberg, where he carried out spectroscopic and photometric studies. He was an important patron of science, supporting especially the Heidelberg-Königstuhl Observatory, the Astronomische Gesellschaft and the Einstein Foundation. Name proposed by the first discoverer, endorsed by G. Klare and H. Mandel. || 
|-id=415
| 7415 Susumuimoto ||  || Susumu Imoto (1901–1981) studied the history of astronomy and old Japanese calendars. With I. Hasegawa, he compiled a catalogue of meteor showers and lent support to the world calendar proposed by E. Achelis. || 
|-id=416
| 7416 Linnankoski ||  || Johannes Linnankoski (Vihtori Peltonen, 1869–1913) was a Finnish writer who promoted Finnish independence from Russia. He is known for his novel, The Song of the Blood-Red Flower (1905). In 1960 the discoverer, Eric Elst, set much of this novel to music. || 
|-id=418
| 7418 Akasegawa ||  || Genpei Akasegawa (born 1937), a famous novelist in Japan. || 
|-id=420
| 7420 Buffon ||  || Georges-Louis Leclerc, Comte de Buffon (1707–1788) was a French naturalist, mathematician, cosmologist, and encyclopédiste. || 
|-id=421
| 7421 Kusaka || 1992 HL || Hideaki Kusaka (1924–1991), an amateur astronomer. || 
|-id=425
| 7425 Lessing ||  || Gotthold Ephraim Lessing (1729–1781) was a German writer, philosopher, and dramatist. || 
|-id=428
| 7428 Abekuniomi || 1992 YM || Abe Kuniomi (born 1941) is an expert photographer of the Moon's surface and planets. || 
|-id=429
| 7429 Hoshikawa ||  || Hoshikawa, or Star River, flows between Kumagaya and Gyoda, in Saitama prefecture. || 
|-id=430
| 7430 Kogure ||  || Tomokazu Kogure (born 1925), professor emeritus of Kyoto University. || 
|-id=431
| 7431 Jettaguilar ||  || Jose A. "Jett" Aguilar (born 1961) is a Filipino neurosurgeon who has saved over one thousand children in the Philippines by volunteering his time and surgical expertise to treat their congenital malformations and brain tumors. He is also an amateur astronomer and serves as vice president of the Astronomical League of the Philippines. || 
|-id=433
| 7433 Pellegrini || 1993 KD || Guglielmo Pellegrini (1937–1990), an Italian amateur astronomer || 
|-id=434
| 7434 Osaka ||  || Osaka, the second largest city in Japan, administrative center of the prefecture, and an important industrial, cultural, business and scientific center. || 
|-id=435
| 7435 Sagamihara ||  || Sagamihara, a city located some 50 km west for Tokyo. || 
|-id=436
| 7436 Kuroiwa ||  || Goro Kuroiwa (1912–1990), Japanese astronomer and observer of variable stars. A student in the department of astronomy at the University of Tokyo on the occasion of the total solar eclipse on 1936 June 19, he independently discovered the nova CP Lac, along with Kazuaki Gomi. While serving with the Japanese army in 1942 he independently discovered the nova CP Pup. He represented Japan in the geodetic survey program using photoelectric observations of lunar occultations, carried out from 1950 to the 1960s by the U.S. Army Map Service Far East. || 
|-id=437
| 7437 Torricelli ||  || Evangelista Torricelli (1608–1647), an Italian mathematician and physicist || 
|-id=438
| 7438 Misakatouge ||  || Misakatouge, a steep and foggy Japanese mountain pass at 720 meters altitude, located near the discovering Kuma Kogen Astronomical Observatory || 
|-id=439
| 7439 Tetsufuse ||  || Tetsuharu Fuse (born 1970) works at the Subaru Telescope, National Astronomical Observatory of Japan. A solar system researcher, interested in the Edgeworth-Kuiper belt objects and natural satellites, he is also the first public relations coordinator at the Subaru Telescope. || 
|-id=440
| 7440 Závist || 1995 EA || Závist (Oppidum Závist), a Czech archaeological site of a Celtic town || 
|-id=441
| 7441 Láska || 1995 OZ || Václav Láska (mathematician) (1862–1943), Czech geophysicist, astronomer, geodetist, and mathematician || 
|-id=442
| 7442 Inouehideo ||  || Hideo Inoue (1917–) was a Japanese astronomer. An astronomy enthusiast while still a child, he studied at the Tokyo College of Physics and at the Institute of Cosmical Physics in Kyoto. While participating in Kyoto University's expedition to the total solar eclipse on 1941 Sept. 21 he obtained color photographs of the solar corona, the first in Japan. He later worked at the Peking Observatory, where he calculated the national ephemeris. After the war he taught at technical high schools in Japan. For the International Geophysical Year he led the Higasimatuyama Moonwatch Team. He is also an enthusiastic ham radio operator. || 
|-id=443
| 7443 Tsumura ||  || Mitsunori Tsumura (born 1955), a science educator at the Wakayama Science Museum. || 
|-id=445
| 7445 Trajanus || 4116 P-L || Trajan (53–117), Roman Emperor || 
|-id=446
| 7446 Hadrianus || 2249 T-2 || Hadrian (76–138), Roman Emperor || 
|-id=447
| 7447 Marcusaurelius || 1142 T-3 || Marcus Aurelius (121–180), Roman Emperor || 
|-id=448
| 7448 Pöllath || 1948 AA || Reinhard Pöllath (born 1948), a professor of tax law at the University of Münster, is an authority on corporate acquisitions and business successions. As founder of the Exzellenz-Stiftung zur Förderung der Max-Planck-Gesellschaft he inspires the community with his fascination for science, in particular for molecular biology || 
|-id=449
| 7449 Döllen || 1949 QL || Johann Heinrich Wilhelm Döllen (1820–1897), a German astronomer at the Dorpat Observatory, was an assistant of W. Struve. Later he worked on geodetic problems at the Pulkovo Observatory. Döllen is notable for his discussion on errors of heliometer observations. The name was suggested by L. D. Schmadel (Src). || 
|-id=450
| 7450 Shilling || 1968 OZ || Pavel Schilling (1786–1837) was a Russian inventor and orientalist. In 1832 he became the first to invent an electromagnetic telegraph suitable for practical use. He investigated the history and languages of Asian peoples and gathered a large collection of oriental manuscripts. || 
|-id=451
| 7451 Verbitskaya ||  || Lyudmila Alekseevna Verbitskaya (1936–2019), a professor of general linguistics, is an authority on Russian and experimental phonetics. As rector of St. Petersburg University she has created and supported favorable conditions for the development of higher education and science. The name was suggested by K. V. Kholshevnikov. || 
|-id=452
| 7452 Izabelyuria ||  || Izabella Yurieva (1900–2000) was a Russian singer and performer of lyric songs and romances. || 
|-id=453
| 7453 Slovtsov ||  || Petr Andreevich Slovtsov (1767–1843), historiographer of Siberia and founder of regional studies of Siberia || 
|-id=454
| 7454 Kevinrighter ||  || Kevin Righter (born 1965) is an American  curator of Antarctic meteorites at NASA's Johnson Space Center. His research focuses on the chemical processes occurring during early planetary differentiation. || 
|-id=455
| 7455 Podosek ||  || Frank A. Podosek (born 1941) is an American professor at Washington University in St. Louis. His research centers on the uses of isotopic analysis of natural materials in elucidating the character and history of our planet and our planetary system. || 
|-id=456
| 7456 Doressoundiram || 1982 OD || Alain Doressoundiram (born 1968), French planetary scientist. He has worked on the collisional evolution of the population of minor planets, in particular the formation and evolution of binary systems during a family-forming collision. He has contributed to the spectroscopic characterization of a number of minor planet families and helped plan the Rosetta and DS4-Champollion space missions. Name suggested and citation prepared by M. A. Barucci and M. Fulchignoni. || 
|-id=457
| 7457 Veselov ||  || Vyacheslav Afanasievich Veselov (born 1930),  a Russian space scientist and consultant on the automatic Lunokhods, made the small-site photolocation systems for driving the Mars Rover and planet rovers. He directed the performance of the astrophysical devices aboard the Mir station for research on the fine structure of the earth's atmosphere. || 
|-id=459
| 7459 Gilbertofranco ||  || Gilberto Franco (born 1952), a medical doctor at San Damiano, Asti, is a very good friend of the discoverer and an enthusiastic amateur astronomer || 
|-id=460
| 7460 Julienicoles || 1984 JN || Julie Laine Nicoles (born 1986) has worked as a life guard, as a caregiver for her grandmother, and for several years at the Sylvan Learning Center and the Jasper Elementary school in Rancho Cucamonga, California. She is now a student at Chaffey College nearby || 
|-id=461
| 7461 Kachmokiam || 1984 TD || Katherine Galindo, Christine Galindo, Molly Thompson, Kimberly Galindo and Amy Galindo, nieces of Donna Thompson, administrator for the Minor Planet Center || 
|-id=462
| 7462 Grenoble ||  || Grenoble, France, the French city, located in the foothills of the western Alps || 
|-id=463
| 7463 Oukawamine || 1985 SB || Oukawamine, a high plateau at the boundary of Kochi and Ehime prefectures || 
|-id=464
| 7464 Vipera ||  || The viper) family of snakes, and more particularly Vipera berus, the adder or northern viper, which inhabits Kleť mountain || 
|-id=465
| 7465 Munkanber ||  || John Munger, Veikko Kanto and Richard Berry, the authors of The CCD Cookbook. By providing detailed instructions and software, they have made it possible for the amateur astronomer to construct and operate an efficient, low-cost CCD camera. The final imaging and astrometry of this minor planet was carried out with such a camera made by the discoverer. || 
|-id=468
| 7468 Anfimov ||  || Nikolaj Apollonovich Anfimov (born 1935), a Russian space scientist and co-chairman of the Russian-American cosmic committee, is a well-known scientist in space technology and the theory of heat-mass exchange. He received an award from NASA and is an officer of the French Légion d'honneur. || 
|-id=469
| 7469 Krikalev ||  || Sergei Krikalev (born 1958), a Russian cosmonaut who worked aboard the space missions Discovery and Endeavor and was commander of the crews of Mir and the International Space Station. He spent 803 days in space during six flights. He was awarded a special medal by NASA. || 
|-id=470
| 7470 Jabberwock || 1991 JA || The Jabberwock is a mythical creature that is the subject of the classic nonsense poem Jabberwocky in Lewis Carroll's delightful tale Through the Looking Glass and what Alice found there. || 
|-id=472
| 7472 Kumakiri || 1992 CU || Kazuo Kumakiri (born 1923), a Japanese amateur astronomer in the Susono area who has done much to develop a local interest in astronomy. || 
|-id=475
| 7475 Kaizuka ||  || Sohei Kaizuka (1926–1998), a Japanese geomorphologists. His significant academic achievements covered various landforms, from global to local scale. Many scientists have been inspired by his ideas and advice. || 
|-id=476
| 7476 Ogilsbie || 1993 GE || Brian K. Ogilsbie (1970–1997), a close friend of American astronomer Timothy B. Spahr, who discovered this minor planet. || 
|-id=478
| 7478 Hasse ||  || Peter Hasse (1585–1640), a German organist || 
|-id=480
| 7480 Norwan || 1994 PC || Norwan, the goddess of light of the Wintun Native American peoples of Northern California || 
|-id=481
| 7481 San Marcello ||  || San Marcello Pistoiese in Italy, the mountain village where the Pian dei Termini Observatory is located. || 
|-id=483
| 7483 Sekitakakazu ||  || Takakazu Seki (1642–1708), Japanese mathematician and calendar scientist || 
|-id=484
| 7484 Dogo Onsen ||  || Dōgo Onsen, Japanese hot spring in Ehime || 
|-id=485
| 7485 Changchun || 1994 XO || Changchun, a Chinese city, is the international sister city of Sendai, Japan, affiliated since 1980. Changchun is the capital of the Kitsurin province and the center of political and economical activities of the province. || 
|-id=486
| 7486 Hamabe ||  || Masaru Hamabe (born 1951), a professor at Japan Women's University. || 
|-id=487
| 7487 Toshitanaka || 1994 YM || Toshinari Tanaka (born 1954), physicist and amateur astronomer. || 
|-id=488
| 7488 Robertpaul ||  || Robert Paul Hergenrother (born 1976), the brother of astronomer Carl W. Hergenrother, who discovered this minor planet. || 
|-id=489
| 7489 Oribe || 1995 MX || Takaaki Oribe (born 1972), Japanese researcher at Saji Observatory since its foundation in 1994, has contributed comet observations to the International Comet Quarterly. He serves as an executive member of a local astronomy club, "Tottori Society of Astronomy" and contributes to the popularization of astronomy. || 
|-id=490
| 7490 Babička ||  || Marie Macháčová (1922–1998) and Marie Petrželová (1912–1998), the grandmothers of the discoverer's wife; and Emilie Dudková (1914–1977) and Aloisie Pravcová (born 1917), the grandmothers of the discoverer. This naming is also devoted to all grandmothers, who traditionally have a major role in bringing up children in the Czech nation. This role is also reflected in the novel "Babička" ("Granny"), written by Božena Němcová, based on her own childhood experience. || 
|-id=491
| 7491 Linzerag ||  || Astronomical Society of Linz (Linzer Astronomische Gemeinschaft; Linzer A.G.), an association of Austrian amateur astronomers on the occasion of its 50th anniversary; the number of this minor planet, written backwards, is the year the association was founded (1947) || 
|-id=492
| 7492 Kačenka || 1995 UX || Kateřina Macháčová (born 1975), wife of Czech astronomer Petr Pravec, who discovered this minor planet. || 
|-id=493
| 7493 Hirzo ||  || Hirzo (died 1275), Bohemian knight and founder of the royal town of České Budějovice, Czech Republic, home town of the discoverer, Jana Tichá || 
|-id=494
| 7494 Xiwanggongcheng ||  || Project Hope (Xiwang Gongcheng), a non-profit social welfare program operated by the China Youth Development Foundation, on the occasion of its 10th anniversary. || 
|-id=495
| 7495 Feynman ||  || Richard P. Feynman (1918–1988), American physicist and 1965 Nobel prize laureate || 
|-id=496
| 7496 Miroslavholub ||  || Miroslav Holub (1923–1998), Czech immunologist, poet and essayist. His research resulted in the monograph Immunology of Nude Mice. His fine poetry combines the world of science and the world of everyday human experience, as shown, for example, in his book Supposed to Fly. Name proposed by the discoverer following a suggestion by J. Ticha. || 
|-id=497
| 7497 Guangcaishiye ||  || The Glory Project (Guangcai Shiye), an open poverty relief activity in China. The project actively assists the poor with training, initiating enterprises, developing resources and carrying out commerce. Its operation promotes traditional Chinese virtues and advances the prospects of the poor. || 
|-id=498
| 7498 Blaník || 1996 BF || Blaník Hill, Czech Republic, legendary resting place of the army of Saint Wenceslas || 
|-id=499
| 7499 L'Aquila ||  || L'Aquila, a medieval Italian town of about 53,000 people near the Gran Sasso, in central Italy. || 
|-id=500
| 7500 Sassi || 1996 TN || Giorgio Sassi (1918–2009), Italian amateur astronomer who co-founded the San Vittore Observatory (Src). || 
|}

7501–7600 

|-
| 7501 Farra ||  || The Italian town of Farra d'Isonzo and location of the Farra d'Isonzo Observatory, where this asteroid was discovered || 
|-id=502
| 7502 Arakida ||  || Hideyoshi Arakida (born 1973) is an associate professor at Nihon University, who specializes in celestial mechanics, including solar system dynamics. His latest research interests are the null structure of spacetime and the effect of cosmological constant on the local system. || 
|-id=504
| 7504 Kawakita ||  || Hideyo Kawakita (born 1970), Japanese astronomer and staff member at the Gunma Astronomical Observatory. His work includes comets, planets, and the formation of the Solar System. || 
|-id=505
| 7505 Furusho ||  || Reiko Furusho (born 1970), a Japanese astronomer who works in cometary physics and in the education and popularization of astronomy. Her main scientific interests include the properties of cometary dust, especially polarization by dust particles. || 
|-id=506
| 7506 Lub || 4837 P-L || Jan Lub (born 1946), Dutch astronomer || 
|-id=507
| 7507 Israel || 7063 P-L || Frank Pieter Israel (born 1946), Dutch astronomer || 
|-id=508
| 7508 Icke || 2327 T-3 ||  (born 1946), Dutch astronomer at Leiden Observatory || 
|-id=509
| 7509 Gamzatov || 1977 EL || Rasul Gamzatov (1923–2003), Dagestanian poet || 
|-id=511
| 7511 Patcassen ||  || Patrick Cassen (born 1940), American astrophysicist and planetary scientist at NASA's Ames Research Center. His research focuses on star and planet formation, the physics of circumstellar disks, and the application of astrophysical models to the formation of the solar system. || 
|-id=512
| 7512 Monicalazzarin ||  || Monica Lazzarin (born 1963), Italian astronomer at Padova Observatory || 
|-id=515
| 7515 Marrucino ||  || Marrucino was an ancient tribe that lived in Abruzzo. San Martino sulla Marrucina is renowned worldwide for its wine and chitarra, a special kind of pasta. It is also famous for polverieri, a group of artisans and merchants who for five centuries produced gunpowder from grape charcoal following a secret recipe || 
|-id=516
| 7516 Kranjc || 1987 MC || Aldo Kranjc (1919–1994), Italian astronomer at the observatories in Naples, Milan and Bologna. He succeeded F. Zagar as director of Brera-Merate Observatory in 1971. His many activities and studies included general relativity and applications of electronic techniques to astronomy and spectroscopy. He was a pioneer in Italy on numerical electronic calculus. He wrote several programs and articles on orbit determination. || 
|-id=517
| 7517 Alisondoane || 1989 AD || Alison Doane (1958–2017) has held the position of assistant curator (from 1983 to 2001) and curator (from 2001 to 2016) of astronomical photographs at the Harvard College Observatory. She was also principal oboe with the Boston Philharmonic Orchestra from 1982 to 2001. || 
|-id=519
| 7519 Paulcook ||  || In the face of extreme physical problems resulting from an accident at age 12, Paul A. Cook (born 1981) has shown remarkable determination to use his mental powers to study astronomy. He has learned how to use a computer by special means and has produced some extremely good graphics for the discoverer. || 
|-id=525
| 7525 Kiyohira || 1992 YE || Kiyohira Fujiwara (1056–1128), founder of Fujiwara clan in Japan || 
|-id=526
| 7526 Ohtsuka || 1993 AA || Katsuhito Ohtsuka (born 1959), a curator of Tokyo Meteor Network and its meteorite collection. || 
|-id=527
| 7527 Marples || 1993 BJ || Peter Marples (born 1958), Australian amateur astronomer, discoverer of supernova 2008fa in NGC 6722 and member of the Southern Astronomical Society || 
|-id=528
| 7528 Huskvarna ||  || The Swedish city of Huskvarna || 
|-id=529
| 7529 Vagnozzi || 1994 BC || Antonio Vagnozzi (born 1950), Italian amateur astronomer and discoverer of minor planets || 
|-id=530
| 7530 Mizusawa ||  || Commemoration of hundredth anniversary of International Latitude Observatory at Mizusawa, Japan || 
|-id=531
| 7531 Pecorelli || 1994 SC || Antonio Pecorelli (1923–1986), a long-time bus and tram conductor in Terni, near Rome, Italy || 
|-id=532
| 7532 Pelhřimov ||  || Pelhřimov, town in the Czech Republic || 
|-id=533
| 7533 Seiraiji ||  || Seiraiji is a Japanese Temple built in Sumoto, Japan, around 1000 CE, in the late Heian era. This Buddhist temple with graves is located on the small hill Kyuko-san, which was made by rivers in a delta area. || 
|-id=536
| 7536 Fahrenheit ||  || Gabriel Fahrenheit (1686–1736), German-born Dutch scientist || 
|-id=537
| 7537 Solvay ||  || Ernest Solvay (1838–1922), Belgian chemist and philanthropist || 
|-id=538
| 7538 Zenbei ||  || Iwahashi Zenbei (1756–1811) is known for building the most superior Japanese telescope in the Edo era. His family worked as opticians in Osaka for four generations after him. || 
|-id=541
| 7541 Nieuwenhuis || 4019 T-3 || Henk Nieuwenhuis (born 1938), Dutch amateur astronomer, Eisinga Planetarium || 
|-id=542
| 7542 Johnpond || 1953 GN || John Pond (1767–1836), sixth Astronomer Royal, is famous for the introduction of then-modern transit instruments at Greenwich Observatory and for publishing a high-precision star catalogue. Pond received the Copley Medal of the Royal Society || 
|-id=543
| 7543 Prylis || 1973 SY || Prylis, son of Hermes from Greek mythology || 
|-id=544
| 7544 Tipografiyanauka ||  || The oldest printing-house (tipografiya in Russian) of the Russian Academy of Sciences bears the name "Nauka" (science). It was founded in 1727 in St. Petersburg. || 
|-id=545
| 7545 Smaklösa || 1978 OB || Smaklösa, Swedish musical group || 
|-id=546
| 7546 Meriam ||  || The Meriam are an Indigenous Australian group of people in the islands of the eastern Torres Strait, united by a common language, who developed complex systems of astronomical knowledge that paved the way for modern ethnography. || 
|-id=547
| 7547 Martinnakata ||  || Martin Nakata   is a professor and Pro Vice-Chancellor (Indigenous Education and Strategy) at James Cook University in Townsville, Australia. He is an Indigenous Torres Strait Islander from the island of Naghir. He leads research and educational curricula at the interface of Indigenous astronomy and Western astrophysics. || 
|-id=548
| 7548 Engström ||  || Albert Engström (1869–1940), Swedish writer and artist || 
|-id=549
| 7549 Woodard ||  || Adrian Russell Woodard, youngest grandson of the discoverers Carolyn and Eugene Shoemaker || 
|-id=550
| 7550 Woolum ||  || Dorothy S. Woolum (born 1942), American astrophysicist and meteoriticist || 
|-id=551
| 7551 Edstolper ||  || Edward M. Stolper (born 1952), American geologist || 
|-id=552
| 7552 Sephton ||  || Mark A. Sephton (born 1966), British geochemist and meteoriticist || 
|-id=553
| 7553 Buie || 1981 FG || Marc W. Buie (born 1958), American astronomer and discoverer of minor planets || 
|-id=554
| 7554 Johnspencer || 1981 GQ || John R. Spencer (born 1957), an astronomer at Lowell Observatory. || 
|-id=555
| 7555 Venvolkov ||  || Veniamin Vasilevich Volkov (born 1921), world-renowned ophthalmologist || 
|-id=556
| 7556 Perinaldo ||  || The Italian village of Perinaldo in Liguria || 
|-id=558
| 7558 Yurlov ||  || Aleksandr Aleksandrovich Yurlov (1927–1963), Russian choir master and choral conductor. || 
|-id=559
| 7559 Kirstinemeyer || 1985 VF || Kirstine Meyer (1861–1941), first Danish woman to obtain a degree in physics (in 1892), founder of Fysisk Tidsskrift || 
|-id=560
| 7560 Spudis || 1986 AJ || Paul Spudis (1952–2018), American planetary geologist and lunar scientist || 
|-id=561
| 7561 Patrickmichel ||  || Patrick Michel (born 1970), French dynamicist. || 
|-id=562
| 7562 Kagiroino-Oka ||  || Place in one of the poems in the collection Manyousyu || 
|-id=564
| 7564 Gokumenon || 1988 CA || M. G. K. Menon (1928–2016; Mambillikalathil Govind Kumar Menon) professor of the Indian Space Research Organisation, who provided strong support for the 2.3-meter Vainu Bappu telescope and the Ootacamund radioastronomy facility || 
|-id=565
| 7565 Zipfel ||  || Jutta Zipfel (born 1964), German curator of meteorites at the Senckenberg Research Institute in Frankfurt || 
|-id=571
| 7571 Weisse Rose ||  || White Rose, a resistance movement in Germany in World War II which called for nonviolent resistance to the Nazi regime. Numerous members of the movement were arrested and executed || 
|-id=572
| 7572 Znokai || 1989 SF || Znokai, a cultural and social organization of staff of Mizusawa International Latitude Observatory || 
|-id=573
| 7573 Basfifty || 1989 VX || Named for the Birmingham Astronomical Society in Birmingham, Great Britain, in celebration of its fiftieth anniversary in 2000. The Society was established in 1950, largely as a result of the University of Birmingham's extramural classes on astronomy. || 
|-id=575
| 7575 Kimuraseiji || 1989 YK || Seiji Kimura (born 1932), an amateur astronomer. || 
|-id=578
| 7578 Georgböhm ||  || Georg Böhm (1661–1733), German organist || 
|-id=580
| 7580 Schwabhausen ||  || Schwabhausen Station of the Jena Observatory, located 10 kilometers from the city of Jena, Germany || 
|-id=581
| 7581 Yudovich ||  || Viktor Iosifovich Yudovich (born 1934), a professor of mathematics at Rostov University, Russia || 
|-id=583
| 7583 Rosegger ||  || Peter Rosegger (1843–1918), Austrian poet, novelist and writer || 
|-id=584
| 7584 Ossietzky ||  || Carl von Ossietzky (1889–1938), German pacifist and recipient of the Nobel Peace Prize in 1935 || 
|-id=586
| 7586 Bismarck ||  || Otto von Bismarck (1815–1898), Prussian prime minister and minister of foreign affairs and, from 1871, the so-called Great Chancellor of the German Reich. || 
|-id=587
| 7587 Weckmann ||  || Matthias Weckmann (c. 1616–1674), German organist || 
|-id=590
| 7590 Aterui ||  || Aterui, patriarch of the Ainu tribe in northern Japan in the late eighth century || 
|-id=592
| 7592 Takinemachi ||  || Takine, a town in Fukushima prefecture, 250 km north of Tokyo || 
|-id=593
| 7593 Cernuschi ||  ||  (1907–1999), an Uruguayan physicist and astrophysicist and founder of Uruguay's first university dedicated to research and education in physics and astronomy. || 
|-id=594
| 7594 Shotaro ||  || Shotaro Miyamoto (1912–1992), professor of astrophysics at Kyoto University || 
|-id=595
| 7595 Växjö ||  || The Swedish city of Växjö || 
|-id=596
| 7596 Yumi || 1993 GH || Shigeru Yumi (1916–?), Japanese astronomer and a former director of the International Polar Motion Service || 
|-id=597
| 7597 Shigemi || 1993 GM || Shigemi Uchida (born 1952) is actively working to combat light pollution in Japan. He is an organizer of the Japan Section of the International Dark Sky Association and also a member of the Japanese dark-sky organization Hoshizora-wo-Mamoru-Kai. || 
|-id=599
| 7599 Munari || 1994 PB || Ulisse Munari (born 1960), Italian astronomer and discoverer of minor planets || 
|-id=600
| 7600 Vacchi ||  || Ciro Vacchi (born 1916), Italian amateur astronomer and co-founder of the San Vittore Observatory at Bologna, Italy || 
|}

7601–7700 

|-id=602
| 7602 Yidaeam ||  || Dae-am Yi (born 1955), vice president of Saekung College in the Republic of Korea || 
|-id=603
| 7603 Salopia ||  || Latin name for Shropshire, England || 
|-id=604
| 7604 Kridsadaporn ||  || Kridsadaporn (San) Ritsmitchai (1964–2004) was born in Songhkla, Thailand. She and her husband Martin Callaway both lived and worked at Siding Spring Observatory. San is remembered in Coonabarabran for her caring nature and community work. She died in a car accident. || 
|-id=605
| 7605 Cindygraber ||  || Cynthia Jean (Volinsky) Graber (born 1956) is an American psychologist, theatre aficionado, nature lover and rock collector. A steadfast advocate for kindness, compassion and curiosity, she has spent more than 30 years helping adults, children, and families navigate the human condition with warmth and patience. || 
|-id=607
| 7607 Billmerline ||  || William J. Merline (born 1954), planetary scientist at the Southwest Research Institute in Boulder, Colorado. || 
|-id=608
| 7608 Telegramia ||  || The IAU Circulars (originally circulated by telegram) || 
|-id=610
| 7610 Sudbury || 1995 XB || Sudbury, Massachusetts || 
|-id=611
| 7611 Hashitatsu ||  || Tatsuo Hashimoto (born 1912) has been a member of the Oriental Astronomical Association since the 1930s and an advisor to the Oita Astronomical Society since its founding in 1979. In 1944 he won a patent for his invention of a new type of protractor in which a right angle has 60 degrees. || 
|-id=613
| 7613 ʻAkikiki || 1996 DK || The ʻakikiki (Oreomystis bairdi), or Kauaʻi creeper, is a critically endangered Hawaiian honeycreeper, now found only in high-elevation rainforests on Kauaʻi. || 
|-id=614
| 7614 Masatomi || 1996 EA || Masatomi Urata (born 1925) has been a member of the Oriental Astronomical Association and an active observer of meteors since 1943. He has also been an adviser to the Oita Astronomical Society since its founding in 1979 and has greatly contributed to the growth of younger astronomers. || 
|-id=616
| 7616 Sadako ||  || Sadako Sasaki (1943–1955) was exposed to radiation from the Hiroshima atom bomb and suffered from leukemia. She tried to fold 1000 paper cranes in prayer for recovery, but in vain. Impressed by her story, children around the world raised funds and built the Children's Peace Monument in Hiroshima Peace Memorial Park. || 
|-id=618
| 7618 Gotoyukichi ||  || Yukichi Goto (1896–1929), pioneer of civil aviation in Japan. || 
|-id=620
| 7620 Willaert || 4077 P-L || Adrian Willaert (1485–1562), Flemish composer || 
|-id=621
| 7621 Sweelinck || 4127 P-L || Jan Pieterszoon Sweelinck (1562–1621), Dutch composer and organist || 
|-id=622
| 7622 Pergolesi || 6624 P-L || Giovanni Battista Pergolesi (1710–1736), Italian composer || 
|-id=623
| 7623 Stamitz || 9508 P-L || Johann Stamitz (1717–1757), German-Bohemian violinist and composer || 
|-id=624
| 7624 Gluck || 1251 T-1 || Christoph Willibald Gluck (1714–1787), German composer || 
|-id=625
| 7625 Louisspohr || 2150 T-2 || Louis Spohr (1784–1859), German composer and violinist || 
|-id=626
| 7626 Iafe ||  || IAFE, the Argentine Institute of Astronomy and Space Physics (Instituto de Astronomía y Física del Espacio) in Buenos Aires, Argentina || 
|-id=627
| 7627 Wakenokiyomaro ||  || Wake no Kiyomaro, Japanese official || 
|-id=628
| 7628 Evgenifedorov || 1977 QY || Evgenij Pavlovich Fedorov (1909–1986), an astrometrist || 
|-id=629
| 7629 Foros ||  || Crimean health resort || 
|-id=630
| 7630 Yidumduma ||  || Bill Yidumduma Harney (born 1931) is a Senior Elder of the Wardaman Aboriginal people of Australia's Northern Territory. He has shared his traditional astronomical knowledge through film, television, and books, including Dark Sparkers and Four Circles. || 
|-id=631
| 7631 Vokrouhlický || 1981 WH || David Vokrouhlický (born 1966), a Czech physicist at Charles University, Prague. || 
|-id=632
| 7632 Stanislav ||  || Stanislav Volodymyrovych Tel'nyuk (1935–1990), Ukrainian poet, public figure an father of Lesya and Galyna, known as The Telnyuk Sisters || 
|-id=633
| 7633 Volodymyr ||  || Volodymyr Volodymyrovych Tel'nyuk-Adamchuk (born 1936), Ukrainian astronomer and vice president of the Ukrainian Astronomical Association and director of the Kiev University Observatory || 
|-id=634
| 7634 Shizutani-Kou ||  || Oldest Japanese school building || 
|-id=635
| 7635 Carolinesmith ||  || Caroline Smith (born 1976) the Head of Earth Sciences Collections and Principal Curator of Meteorites at the Natural History Museum in London. She studies mineralogy of meteorites, notably ureilites, to understand planetary processes, collected meteorites in Australia and has been principal editor of the Meteoritical Bulletin. || 
|-id=636
| 7636 Comba || 1984 CM || Paul G. Comba (born 1926), who gave up a career in celestial mechanics and astronomy for one in mathematics and computer science. || 
|-id=638
| 7638 Gladman || 1984 UX || Brett J. Gladman (born 1966), a Canadian astronomer (Src) || 
|-id=639
| 7639 Offutt ||  || Warren B. Offutt (1928–2017), was an American amateur astronomer and discoverer of minor planets, on the occasion of his 70th birthday, 1998 Feb. 13. After a career as an engineering executive, he turned in his retirement to the astronomical applications of CCDs, considering in particular the contributions that can be made by amateur astronomers. At his observatory in New Mexico he has made key observations of several of the objects discovered in the Kuiper Belt in recent years, as well as of other comets and minor planets as faint as 22nd magnitude. His follow-up of S/1997 U 2, one of the two recently discovered satellites of Uranus, played a crucial role in the establishment of its orbit. || 
|-id=640
| 7640 Marzari || 1985 PX || Francesco Marzari (born 1961), an Italian planetary scientist at the University of Padua || 
|-id=641
| 7641 Cteatus ||  || Cteatus, from Greek mythology. He was born a conjoined twin of Eurytus and later was the father of Amphimachus. || 
|-id=644
| 7644 Cslewis ||  || C. S. Lewis, British writer || 
|-id=645
| 7645 Pons ||  || Jean Louis Pons, French astronomer || 
|-id=647
| 7647 Etrépigny ||  || Étrépigny, French village || 
|-id=648
| 7648 Tomboles ||  || Tom Boles, British amateur astronomer, supernova hunter, president of the British Astronomical Association during 2003–2005, and discoverer of 84417 Ritabo || 
|-id=649
| 7649 Bougainville ||  || Louis-Antoine de Bougainville, French explorer || 
|-id=650
| 7650 Kaname || 1990 UG || Kaname Nakamura (1904–1932), Japanese amateur astronomer and volunteer at the Kwasan Observatory || 
|-id=651
| 7651 Villeneuve ||  || Don Villeneuve, anthropologist, friend of the discoverer Eric Walter Elst || 
|-id=655
| 7655 Adamries ||  || Adam Ries (1492–1559), German arithmetician and author of the first arithmetic books in German || 
|-id=656
| 7656 Joemontani || 1992 HX || Joseph L. Montani (born 1952), is an American researcher, instrumentalist, observational astronomer, and optics expert with the LPL of the University of Arizona and member of the Spacewatch team, who most recently discovered many near-earth minor planets, main-belt asteroids, and four (4) comets including 314P/Montani.  He has also had previous careers in laboratory astrophysics (modeling asteroidal surfaces), and in millimeter-wave radio-astronomy, and airborne and ground-based infrared-astronomy (Src) || 
|-id=657
| 7657 Jefflarsen ||  || Jeffrey A. Larsen (born 1967), a software expert. || 
|-id=660
| 7660 Alexanderwilson ||  || Alexander Wilson (1714–1786) was the first professor of practical astronomy at the University of Glasgow. He measured atmospheric temperature with height and, from the "Wilson Effect", developed a model of sunspots || 
|-id=661
| 7661 Reincken ||  || Johann Adam Reincken, German organist || 
|-id=664
| 7664 Namahage ||  || The Namahage is a folk event that has been handed down from olden times in Oga Peninsula in Akita Prefecture. It is designated an "Important Intangible Folk Cultural Property". || 
|-id=665
| 7665 Putignano ||  || Putignano, a town and comune in the province of Bari, Apulia, Italy || 
|-id=666
| 7666 Keyaki ||  || The Zelkova serrata tree, (keyaki in Japanese) an ornamental tree prominent in the city of Sendai, Japan || 
|-id=668
| 7668 Mizunotakao ||  || Takao Mizuno, a professor at Tokyo's Gakugei University. || 
|-id=669
| 7669 Malše || 1995 PB || The Malše, Czech river || 
|-id=670
| 7670 Kabeláč || 1995 QJ || Miloslav Kabeláč (1908–1979), a Czech composer and conductor || 
|-id=671
| 7671 Albis ||  || Latin name for the Elbe river || 
|-id=672
| 7672 Hawking ||  || Stephen Hawking (1942–2018), British physicist || 
|-id=673
| 7673 Inohara ||  || Masanori Inohara (born 1921) has been an amateur astronomer since childhood. He contributed greatly to the popularization of astronomy, especially in schools after the Second World War, when Japan was very poor. He is also an enthusiastic chaser of solar eclipses. || 
|-id=674
| 7674 Kasuga ||  || Ryo Kasuga (born 1950), Japanese Buddhist priest || 
|-id=675
| 7675 Gorizia ||  || Gorizia, the Italian town on the 1000th anniversary of the first mention of its actual name in an official document. Gorizia is the main city in the lowlands of river Isonzo River. || 
|-id=677
| 7677 Sawa ||  || Takeyasu Sawa (born 1949), a professor of education at Aichi University. || 
|-id=678
| 7678 Onoda ||  || The city of Onoda in Yamaguchi Prefecture, Japan || 
|-id=679
| 7679 Asiago ||  || The Italian town of Asiago, where the Asiago Observatory and its station is located || 
|-id=680
| 7680 Cari || 1996 HB || Amleto Cari (1904–1982), versatile athlete of rare talent, from 1919 to 1933 he was captain of the Terni football team that, under his guidance, reached the national league. || 
|-id=681
| 7681 Chenjingrun ||  || Chen Jingrun (1933–1996) a Chinese mathematician || 
|-id=682
| 7682 Miura ||  || Katsumi Miura, technical official of the Earthquake Research Institute of the University of Tokyo. || 
|-id=683
| 7683 Wuwenjun || 1997 DE || Wenjun Wu (1919–), a member of the Chinese Academy of Sciences, is the originator in the research on mathematics mechanization in China. || 
|-id=684
| 7684 Marioferrero || 1997 EY || Mario A. Ferrero (1904–1965), Italian astronomer || 
|-id=686
| 7686 Wolfernst || 2024 P-L || Wolfgang Ernst (born 1947), German amateur astronomer associated with the Starkenburg Observatory || 
|-id=687
| 7687 Matthias || 2099 P-L || Matthias Busch (born 1968), German amateur astronomer associated with the Starkenburg Observatory || 
|-id=688
| 7688 Lothar || 2536 P-L || Lothar Kurtze (born 1972), German amateur astronomer || 
|-id=689
| 7689 Reinerstoss || 4036 P-L || Reiner Michael Stoss (born 1975), German amateur astronomer and discoverer of minor planets || 
|-id=690
| 7690 Sackler || 2291 T-1 || Raymond and Beverly Sackler, wise, perceptive and generous supporters of science and the arts. || 
|-id=691
| 7691 Brady || 3186 T-3 || Charles E. Brady Jr. (born 1951), a captain in the U.S. Navy, NASA astronaut, surgeon, experienced amateur radio operator and close friend to the name proposer. || 
|-id=692
| 7692 Edhenderson ||  || Edward P. Henderson (1898–1992), American curator of meteorites at the Smithsonian Institution until 1992. || 
|-id=693
| 7693 Hoshitakuhai || 1982 WE || "Hoshitakuhai" (Home delivery of the starry skies) is an activity of the Kakogawa Space Science Association that brings the wonders of the stars to the public || 
|-id=694
| 7694 Krasetín || 1983 SF || Krasetín, a small Czech village near to the Kleť Observatory || 
|-id=695
| 7695 Přemysl ||  || Přemysl, legendary Bohemian ruler || 
|-id=696
| 7696 Liebe || 1988 JD || Bodo Liebe, a professor at the University of Siegen. || 
|-id=698
| 7698 Schweitzer ||  || Albert Schweitzer (1875–1965), German theologian, musician, philosopher, physician and Nobelist || 
|-id=699
| 7699 Božek ||  || Josef Božek, Czech engineer || 
|-id=700
| 7700 Rote Kapelle ||  || Rote Kapelle, a left-wing and communist resistance group who fought against the fascist regime, operating mainly in Berlin and Hamburg. || 
|}

7701–7800 

|-
| 7701 Zrzavý ||  || Jan Zrzavý, Czech artist || 
|-id=704
| 7704 Dellen ||  || Dellen, Swedish lake system formed by a meteor impact || 
|-id=705
| 7705 Humeln ||  || Humeln, Swedish lake formed by a meteor impact || 
|-id=706
| 7706 Mien ||  || Mien, Swedish lake formed by a meteor impact || 
|-id=707
| 7707 Yes ||  || Yes, an English rock and roll music group, has been creating music since 1968. The band is best known for its albums The Yes Album, Fragile, Close to the Edge and 90125. || 
|-id=708
| 7708 Fennimore ||  || Guy Fennimore, British secretary of the Society for Popular Astronomy (formerly the Junior Astronomical Society) || 
|-id=710
| 7710 Ishibashi ||  || Tadashi Ishibashi (born 1926), retired sea captain, became interested in stars in 1936 and has observed meteors since 1940. Since 1947 he has collected and studied ancient documents about the stars. Currently he lectures on star topics aboard large passenger ships || 
|-id=711
| 7711 Říp || 1994 XF || Říp, a hill near Prague, Czech Republic || 
|-id=713
| 7713 Tsutomu || 1995 YE || Tsutomu Ishibashi (born 1949), a Japanese amateur astronomer, has been using the same 0.1-m reflector to photograph Mars, Jupiter and Saturn since 1971 in order to maintain uniformity in the data contained in the images || 
|-id=714
| 7714 Briccialdi ||  || Giulio Briccialdi (1818–1881), Italian flutist and composer || 
|-id=715
| 7715 Leonidarosino ||  || Leonida Rosino (1915–1997), Italian astronomer and director of the Padua and Asiago Observatorie || 
|-id=716
| 7716 Ube ||  || The city of Ube located in Yamaguchi Prefecture, Japan || 
|-id=717
| 7717 Tabeisshi ||  || Japanese amateur astronomer Isshi Tabe (born 1956) has observed Jupiter and other planets for over 25 years and has published many articles about planets. In 1997 he was given a Magellan Award by the Oriental Astronomical Association. He is also well known as a planetarium program producer || 
|-id=718
| 7718 Desnoux ||  || Valerie Desnoux, French amateur astronomer, who was an assistant developer of the heliometer at the Pic du Midi Observatory || 
|-id=720
| 7720 Lepaute || 4559 P-L || Nicole-Reine Lepaute (1723–1788), a French astronomer and mathematician, who help to compute the needed prediction of the 1759 return of Halley's Comet || 
|-id=721
| 7721 Andrillat || 6612 P-L || Yvette Marie Josette (born 1925), French spectroscopist and director of the Haute-Provence Observatory, and her husband Henri Andrillat, French cosmologist and professor of astronomy || 
|-id=722
| 7722 Firneis || 2240 T-2 || Maria Gertrude Firneis (born 1937), Austrian astronomer and a professor of astronomy at the University of Vienna. || 
|-id=723
| 7723 Lugger || 1952 QW || Phyllis Lugger (born 1954), on the faculty of Indiana University, is known for her work on the luminosity functions of galaxies in clusters and on the dynamics of globular clusters and stellar systems, including the Milky Way galaxy and interacting binary stars. She has also worked on the identification of x-ray sources || 
|-id=724
| 7724 Moroso || 1970 OB || Pascuala Moroso, Argentine farmer, upon whose land the Complejo Astronómico El Leoncito (the discovery site) lies || 
|-id=725
| 7725 Selʹvinskij ||  || Ilʹya Lʹvovich Selʹvinskij, Soviet poet || 
|-id=726
| 7726 Olegbykov ||  || Oleg Pavlovich Bykov (born 1938), a Russian  astronomer at the Pulkovo Observatory, is a specialist in astrometry and theoretical astronomy especially known for his work on orbit determination of minor planets and other bodies by the method of parameters of apparent motion and analysis of the astrometric observations. || 
|-id=727
| 7727 Chepurova ||  || Valentina Mikhajlovna Chepurova, a celestial mechanician at the Sternberg Astronomical Institute in Moscow, is known for her research on the dynamics of the small bodies of the solar system by analytical and qualitative methods. As chair of celestial mechanics, she is also much involved with the education of students || 
|-id=728
| 7728 Giblin ||  || Ian Giblin (born 1969), a British physicist who has performed a number of laboratory experiments to simulate hypervelocity impacts among minor planets. Giblin has developed new data analysis tools to study their outcome and to draw conclusions regarding the corresponding actual events. Name proposed and citation written by P. Farinella. || 
|-id=729
| 7729 Golovanov ||  || Yaroslav Kirillovich Golovanov (born 1932) a Russian space engineer and scientific journalist who writes scientific reviews on space problems. As the author of many hundreds of articles and more than 20 books, he is the laureate of many prizes and awards, including the "Golden Pen" medal, the highest award of the Union of Soviet Journalists. || 
|-id=730
| 7730 Sergerasimov ||  || Sergei Gerasimov, 20th-century Soviet actor, pedagogue, film director, and scenario writer || 
|-id=732
| 7732 Ralphpass ||  || Ralph Pass (born 1947), American mathematician and amateur astronomer who worked at NASA for the Apollo and Space Shuttle programs. He has also been Director of the Mendel Observatory  at Merrimack College in Massachusetts (Src). || 
|-id=733
| 7733 Segarpassi ||  || Segar Passi (born 1942) is a Dauareb man and senior elder on Mer (Murray Island) in Australia's Torres Strait. He is an artist who shares extensive traditional knowledge about ecology, meteorology, and astronomy, having co-authored a number of academic papers on the subject. || 
|-id=734
| 7734 Kaltenegger ||  || Austrian-born Lisa Kaltenegger (born 1977) is associate professor of astronomy and director of the Carl Sagan Institute at Cornell University. Her research focuses on exploring new worlds orbiting other stars, especially rocky planets and super-Earths and their atmospheres in the habitable zone. She is an expert in modeling potential habitable worlds and their detectable spectral fingerprint, which can be detected with the next generation of telescopes. || 
|-id=735
| 7735 Scorzelli ||  || Rosa Scorzelli (born 1940) is a Brazilian meteoriticist at the Centro Brasileiro de Pesquisas Físicas. Her research has focused on Mossbauer studies of metallic meteorites to understand the complex cooling histories they experienced during the core formation of minor planets. || 
|-id=736
| 7736 Nizhnij Novgorod ||  || Nizhny Novgorod, is an old Russian city located at the confluence of the Volga and Oka rivers. Founded in 1221, the city is now a large industrial, scientific and cultural center. It is known for many architectural monuments and the famous Nizhnij Novgorod Fair. || 
|-id=737
| 7737 Sirrah || 1981 VU || Alan William Harris (born 1952), a British astronomer. (The name Sirrah is "Harris" spelled backwards) || 
|-id=738
| 7738 Heyman ||  || Michael Heyman (born 1930), secretary and linchpin of the Smithsonian Institution's diverse and incomparably rich programs. Educator, legal scholar, civil rights champion, he has unfailingly supported research at the frontiers of astronomy || 
|-id=739
| 7739 Čech || 1982 CE || Eduard Čech, Czech mathematician || 
|-id=740
| 7740 Petit ||  || French astronomer Jean-Marc Petit (born 1961) for his work on the dynamics of planetary rings. Petit has also investigated the collisional evolution of the minor planet belt and the dynamical evolution of the (243) Ida-Dactyl system. Name suggested and citation provided by A. Morbidelli || 
|-id=741
| 7741 Fedoseev ||  || Vladimir Ivanovich Fedoseev (born 1932), outstanding Russian conductor. He has been artistic director of Tchaikovsky's symphony orchestra in Moscow since 1974. He is also a principal conductor of the Vienna Symphony Orchestra and guest conductor in Tokyo and in many other cities. Fedoseev promotes the Russian classical music of Glinka, Mussorgsky, Rakhmaninov, Sviridov and others. Name suggested by G. Sviridov and supported by the discoverer || 
|-id=742
| 7742 Altamira || 1985 US || Altamira is a cave in northern Spain, whose walls bear paintings and engravings – chiefly of bison, deer, horses and boar – dating from the Stone Age. It is one of the most important prehistoric painted caves. The paintings were discovered in 1879. The name was suggested by M. Tichy. || 
|-id=747
| 7747 Michałowski || 1987 SO || Tadeusz Michałowski (born 1954), Polish astronomer at the Astronomical Observatory of Adam Mickiewicz University in Posnan. Michałowski developed a formalism for computing the pole orientation, shape and sidereal rotation period of a minor planet, incorporating both the magnitude and timing information contained in lightcurve observations, in a simultaneous least-squares solution. This method, or methods similar to it, are now widely used standard analysis tools, and they have greatly improved the quality of such determinations. Name suggested by H. Rickman, citation prepared by A. W. Harris. || 
|-id=749
| 7749 Jackschmitt || 1988 JP || Harrison 'Jack' Schmitt, American planetary geologist, last astronaut on the Moon, and later a senator || 
|-id=750
| 7750 McEwen ||  || Alfred McEwen, American planetary geologist || 
|-id=752
| 7752 Otauchunokai || 1988 US || Otauchunokai, founded in 1970, is an amateur astronomers' club in the Ota city area, Gunma prefecture. Club activities include observations, studies and public education in astronomy. The discoverers are members of this club || 
|-id=754
| 7754 Gopalan ||  || Gopalan Srinivasan (born 1964) is a Canadian geologist, meteoriticist and professor in the department of geology at the University of Toronto. His research focuses on understanding the formation and evolution of the solar system through chemical and isotopic studies of meteorites. || 
|-id=755
| 7755 Haute-Provence ||  || Haute-Provence is a very beautiful region in southern France where, in 1936, the astronomical Haute-Provence Observatory was established. In 1995, the first planet discovered orbiting a star (51 Peg), was found there. From 1986 to 1996, the 60/90 Schmidt telescope was used to search for minor planets || 
|-id=756
| 7756 Scientia ||  || Scientia, the Latin word for science or knowledge, describes the purpose of the U.S. National Science Foundation on the occasion of its 50th anniversary in the year 2000. The NSF has acted as a "patron for pure science", consistently championing excellence in activities that span the entire range of scientific endeavor. || 
|-id=757
| 7757 Kameya || 1990 KO || Osamu Kameya, a researcher at the National Astronomical Observatory of Japan. || 
|-id=758
| 7758 Poulanderson || 1990 KT || Poul Anderson (1926–2001), American science fiction writer who has trained three generations of scientists, engineers and others to appreciate humor, adventure, epic tragedy and the vast scale of the universe. Admired for his mentoring and personal warmth, he has won shelves of literary awards. The name was suggested by D. Brin. || 
|-id=763
| 7763 Crabeels ||  || Henri Crabeels (born 1904) is an internationally known organist and conductor in Antwerp. This minor planet is dedicated to him on the occasion of his 98th birthday || 
|-id=766
| 7766 Jododaira ||  || Jododaira is the place where the first big star parties were held in Japan, the "Chiro's Star Festivals", from 1975 to 1984. Jododaira (1600 m above the sea) is near the top of Mt. Azuma, a famous volcano in Fukushima Prefecture in northeastern Japan. After the violent eruption of the volcano in 1893, Percival Lowell climbed the mountain to investigate the result of the eruption. One hundred years later, an astronomical observatory was established there and is open to the public. Name proposed by the discoverers following a suggestion by M. Koishikawa and T. Sato || 
|-id=767
| 7767 Tomatic ||  || A. U. Tomatic (born 1997), collaborator at the Minor Planet Center. An ardent computer of orbits and distributor of observational data of minor planets and comets, Tomatic published his first contribution to this field on MPEC 1997-Y01 (1997 Dec. 16). Tomatic is a godchild of the MPC astronomers B. G. Marsden and G. V. Williams. Name proposed by the first discoverer in gratitude for Tomatic's indefatigable service || 
|-id=769
| 7769 Okuni ||  || Tomimaru Okuni (born 1931), a retired teacher, is a Japanese amateur astronomer. He has been discovering new minor planets since 1995 at Nanyo in Yamagata prefecture || 
|-id=770
| 7770 Siljan ||  || Siljan, Swedish lake formed by a meteor impact †  || 
|-id=771
| 7771 Tvären ||  || Tvären, Swedish lake formed by a meteor impact †  || 
|-id=773
| 7773 Kyokuchiken || 1992 FS || The National Institute of Polar Research (Japan) (NIPR) also known by its shortened Japanese name "Kyokuchiken". The institute engages in research via its observation stations in the Arctic and Antarctica. It is also an inter-university research institute that supports researchers and works to promote polar science. || 
|-id=775
| 7775 Taiko || 1992 XD || Taiko Takeuchi, a Japanese amateur astronomer || 
|-id=776
| 7776 Takeishi || 1993 BF || Masanori Takeishi (born 1950), a Japanese amateur astronomer and discoverer of minor planets || 
|-id=777
| 7777 Consadole ||  || Consadole, a team in the Japan Professional Football League J1, has its home in Sapporo city, Hokkaido. The team's name is an anagram combining the Japanese word Dosanco ("born in Hokkaido") and the Spanish olé ("bravo!"), a common international cheer at soccer games. The name was suggested by K. Watanabe || 
|-id=778
| 7778 Markrobinson ||  || Mark Robinson, an American planetary geologist who has worked on M-type bodies (Mercury, Moon, Mars, and Minor Planets). He began his career in Alaska, where he prospected for mineral ores and earned his B.S. in geology at the University of Alaska. In Hawaii, he completed his doctorate in 1993 on lunar and martian volcanism and then began his outstanding work on the Clementine mission to the Moon as a member of the U.S. Geological Survey Astrogeology Branch. His efforts, which he continues from his new base at Northwestern University, are now directed to the NEAR spacecraft mission and to future exploration of Mercury. Citation prepared with the assistance of A. McEwen. || 
|-id=779
| 7779 Susanring || 1993 KL || Susan Ivanka Ring (1956–2016), Australian amateur astronomer and member of the Canberra Astronomical Society || 
|-id=780
| 7780 Maren || 1993 NJ || Maren Elizabeth Child, contemporary paragon of compassion, generosity and patience. Her unselfish devotion to family, friends and community is, fortunately, more frequently observed than is this minor planet that now bears her name. Her support and understanding of the sometimes bizarre demands of her partner's minor planet observing schedules can only be interpreted as an equally serious commitment to astronomy || 
|-id=781
| 7781 Townsend || 1993 QT || Charles Townsend, a laser physicist and community-college instructor of astronomy and mathematics || 
|-id=782
| 7782 Mony || 1994 CY || Monica De Magistris (1977–1998), a student of physics at Perugia University and a great lover of astronomy who sometimes visited the Santa Lucia observatory. She organized an astronomy exposition as part of Italy's "Scientific and Technological Culture Week" in 1995, giving lectures on the subject to visitors. In her struggle with illness, she was an example of strength, intelligence and passion throughout her short life || 
|-id=784
| 7784 Watterson || 1994 PL || Bill Watterson (born 1958), the author of the iconic cartoon strip Calvin and Hobbes. || 
|-id=787
| 7787 Annalaura || 1994 WW || Annalaura Calvani, wife of Luciano Tesi, co-discoverer of the object † || 
|-id=788
| 7788 Tsukuba || 1994 XS || The city of Tsukuba in Ibaraki Prefecture, Japan || 
|-id=789
| 7789 Kwiatkowski ||  || Tomasz Kwiatkowski, Polish astronomer at Poznań Observatory || 
|-id=790
| 7790 Miselli ||  || Furio Miselli (1867–1949), Italian poet, singer and songwriter || 
|-id=791
| 7791 Ebicykl || 1995 EB || Ebicykl, a tradition of cycling to Czech and Slovak observatories held by a group of astronomers || 
|-id=794
| 7794 Sanvito ||  || Roberto di San Vito, amateur astronomer. Strongly committed to astronomy and astrometry, he is supporting a new observatory in Montelupo that will bear his name, the "San Vito Observatory" || 
|-id=796
| 7796 Járacimrman || 1996 BG || Jára da Cimrman, fictional Czech genius || 
|-id=797
| 7797 Morita ||  || Yukio Morita (born 1952), a dentist in Hiroshima, is an expert on planetary photography and one of the most active members of the Mars section of the Oriental Astronomical Association || 
|-id=799
| 7799 Martinšolc ||  || Martin Šolc (born 1949), Czech astronomer and head of the Astronomical Institute of Charles University in Prague || 
|-id=800
| 7800 Zhongkeyuan ||  || Named for the Chinese Academy of Sciences (zhong guo ke xue yuan) on the occasion of its 50th anniversary. Founded on 1949 Nov. 1, it is China's most prestigious academic institution and comprehensive research and development center in science and technology. Over the past half century, the Chinese Academy of Sciences has made tremendous contributions to science and technology in China, to the country's economic construction and development and to human civilization and progress || 
|}

7801–7900 

|-
| 7801 Goretti ||  || Vittorio Goretti (1939–2016), Italian amateur astronomer and a discoverer of minor planets || 
|-id=802
| 7802 Takiguchi ||  || Setsuo Takiguchi (1924–1998), Japanese founder and first director of the Hiroshima Children's Museum || 
|-id=803
| 7803 Adachi ||  || Makoto Adachi (born 1953), Japanese elementary school teacher, amateur astronomer, and director of the Oriental Astronomical Association || 
|-id=804
| 7804 Boesgaard || 3083 P-L || Ann Merchant Boesgaard (born 1939), American astronomer † || 
|-id=805
| 7805 Moons || 7610 P-L || Michèle Moons (born 1951), a Belgian astronomer || 
|-id=806
| 7806 Umasslowell || 1971 UM || University of Massachusetts Lowell || 
|-id=807
| 7807 Grier ||  || Jennifer Grier (born 1968), American planetary scientist || 
|-id=808
| 7808 Bagould ||  || Benjamin Apthorp Gould (1824–1896), a pioneering American astronomer, founder of the Astronomical Journal, first director of the Córdoba Observatory, initiator of the Uranometria Argentina || 
|-id=809
| 7809 Marcialangton ||  || Marcia Langton (born 1951) is a Yiman Aboriginal woman, professor, Associate Provost, and Foundation Chair of Australian Indigenous Studies at the University of Melbourne. She leads efforts to incorporate Australian Indigenous astronomical perspectives into the Australian National Curriculum. || 
|-id=811
| 7811 Zhaojiuzhang ||  || Zhao Jiuzhang (1907–1968), a Chinese physicist and pioneer of the Chinese satellite program || 
|-id=812
| 7812 Billward || 1984 UT || William Ward (born 1943), a theoretician who specializes in dynamics and celestial mechanics. Ward has made fundamental contributions to a wide variety of topics in modern planetary science, including both solar nebula and circumplanetary disk dynamics, the origin of the moon, planetesimal formation, planetary ring dynamics, and martian obliquity variations and their coupling to planetwide climatological change. Ward has spent most of his career at the Jet Propulsion Laboratory and Southwest Research Institute, Boulder. Both his talents and his good spirits are enjoyed by colleagues around the world. Name proposed and citation written by S. A. Stern || 
|-id=813
| 7813 Anderserikson ||  || Anders Erikson (born 1965), Swedish astronomer who studied minor-planet spin vectors in Uppsala and at the Institute of Planetary Exploration in Berlin. || 
|-id=815
| 7815 Dolon || 1987 QN || Dolon, mythical Trojan warrior from Greek mythology || 
|-id=816
| 7816 Hanoi || 1987 YA || The city of Hanoi, capital of Vietnam || 
|-id=817
| 7817 Zibiturtle ||  || Elizabeth Turtle, American planetary scientist || 
|-id=818
| 7818 Muirhead || 1990 QO || Brian K. Muirhead, flight system manager and deputy project manager of JPL's Mars Pathfinder mission || 
|-id=820
| 7820 Ianlyon ||  || Ian Lyon (born 1957), a researcher at the University of Manchester, United Kingdom. He studies the isotopic composition of meteorites to investigate the early Solar System and the origin of interstellar grains. Ian has been an associate editor of Meteoritics and Planetary Science. || 
|-id=824
| 7824 Lynch ||  || William Lynch III of the Jet Propulsion Laboratory and an outstanding model of efficiency, friendliness and dedication to his work and responsibilities. He is the epitome of the NASA/JPL motto, "Faster, better and cheaper", in the sense that anyone who works in a highly charged, positive fashion, streamlined for action, leads to a more successful and economical operation. Always with a big smile and a cheerful greeting, he is one of JPL's biggest assets || 
|-id=826
| 7826 Kinugasa || 1991 VO || Sachio Kinugasa (1947–2018), Japanese professional baseball player || 
|-id=828
| 7828 Noriyositosi ||  || Noriyosi Furiya (1838–1914), a pioneer Japanese winegrower, and his great-grandson Tosihiko (Tosi) Tukamoto (born 1931). Tosi introduced a sake-brewing technique of low-temperature fermentation to the winemaking world || 
|-id=829
| 7829 Jaroff ||  || Leon Jaroff (1927–2012), science journalist with a long, distinctive association with Time magazine. Jaroff is internationally known for his well-researched, insightful articles and essays on scientific subjects combining factual reporting and intelligent commentary. He has won many awards and honors for his fine journalism. Through his writing, he has drawn attention to the issue of NEOs and the potentially catastrophic consequences for our civilization should a large comet or asteroid strike the earth || 
|-id=830
| 7830 Akihikotago ||  || Akihiko Tago (born 1932), Japanese amateur astronomer || 
|-id=831
| 7831 François-Xavier || 1993 FQ || François-Xavier Bagnoud (1961–1986), French pilot after whom FXB International is named || 
|-id=833
| 7833 Nilstamm ||  || Nils Tamm (1876–1957), Swedish amateur astronomer and artist whose private observatory is now the Kvistabergs Observatorium, an observing station of Uppsala Astronomical Observatory || 
|-id=835
| 7835 Myroncope || 1993 MC || Myron Cope (1929–2008), an American sports journalist || 
|-id=837
| 7837 Mutsumi || 1993 TX || Mutsumi Abe (born 1957), wife of Japanese discoverer Hiroshi Abe || 
|-id=838
| 7838 Feliceierman || 1993 WA || Felice Ierman (1922–1996), father of this minor planet's co-discoverer Giovanni Ierman, was a strong believer in science and technology who inspired his son's passion for astronomy. He also contributed morally and materially to the construction of the first Farra d´Isonzo observatory || 
|-id=840
| 7840 Hendrika ||  || Hendrika Cornelia Marshall Aikman (née Grootendorst), wife of the discoverer Christopher Aikman || 
|-id=842
| 7842 Ishitsuka || 1994 XQ || Mutsumi Ishitsuka (born 1930), who has worked in Peru since 1957, making coronagraphic observations of the sun at high altitude. In 1979 he built the Cosmos Observatory and in 1988 set up a new coronagraph there that was destroyed by a group of guerrillas. He is currently trying to reconstruct the observatory and to establish a Peruvian National Observatory for teaching astronomy. Name proposed by the discoverers following a suggestion by T. Kuroda and Y. Yamada || 
|-id=844
| 7844 Horikawa ||  || Kuniaki Horikawa (born 1958), a computer systems engineer in Yokohama, started Jupiter observations in 1974, and he has obtained more than 3000 drawings and 8200 central-meridian transit timings. Since 2001 he has served as director of the Jupiter-Saturn Section of the Oriental Astronomical Association || 
|-id=845
| 7845 Mckim || 1996 AC || Richard McKim (born 1958), British astronomer who directed the British Astronomical Association's Mars Section || 
|-id=846
| 7846 Setvák || 1996 BJ || Martin Setvák (born 1958), Czech meteorologist || 
|-id=847
| 7847 Mattiaorsi ||  || Mattia Orsi (born 1995), nephew of Arcetri astronomer Giuseppe Forti || 
|-id=848
| 7848 Bernasconi ||  || Giovanni Bernasconi (1901–1965) and Angelo Bernasconi (1911–1990), Italian amateur astronomers Src || 
|-id=849
| 7849 Janjosefrič || 1996 HR || Jan Frič (1863–1897) and Josef Frič (1861–1945), Czech amateur astronomers. The two brothers founded the Ondřejov Observatory. || 
|-id=850
| 7850 Buenos Aires || 1996 LH || The Argentine city and capital of Buenos Aires || 
|-id=851
| 7851 Azumino ||  || an area in Nagano prefecture, Azumino is the rice field area east of the Japanese Northern Alps. In various places, natural spring water surfaces to form clear mountain streams. Azumino is famous throughout Japan for its beautiful scenery year-round || 
|-id=852
| 7852 Itsukushima || 7604 P-L || Itsukushima Island near Hiroshima City, known as "one of the Scenic Trio of Japan", the island is also called "Miyajima", which means "Shrine Island". The origin of the shrine is not known, but it goes back at least to the sixth century; in the twelfth century its building complex was much enlarged. The shrine and its giant torii gate stand in the sea at high tide. In 1996 the shrine was assigned "World Heritage" recognition by UNESCO. Name proposed by Takeshi Sato || 
|-id=853
| 7853 Confucius || 2086 T-2 || Confucius (551–479 BC), Chinese philosopher || 
|-id=854
| 7854 Laotse || 1076 T-3 || Lao Zi (601–531 BC), Chinese philosopher || 
|-id=855
| 7855 Tagore || 4092 T-3 || Rabindranath Tagore (1861–1941), poet || 
|-id=856
| 7856 Viktorbykov ||  || Viktor Leonidovich Bykov (born 1934), a Russian scientist who is known for his work on the theory of satellite communication. He was a designer of the space communication systems "Ekran" and "Intersputnik", as well as of the direct government line between Russia and the U.S. The name was suggested by the Institute of Applied Astronomy || 
|-id=857
| 7857 Lagerros ||  || Johan S. V. Lagerros (born 1968), a Swedish astronomer || 
|-id=858
| 7858 Bolotov ||  || Andrey Bolotov (1738–1833), Russian writer, scientist, agriculturist, forester and builder of parks || 
|-id=859
| 7859 Lhasa || 1979 US || Lhasa the capital of Tibet || 
|-id=860
| 7860 Zahnle || 1980 PF || Kevin J. Zahnle (born 1955), American space research scientist || 
|-id=861
| 7861 Messenger ||  || Scott R. Messenger (born 1969), an American space scientist at NASA's Johnson Space Center. He pioneered research on the identification of pre-solar molecular cloud material in interplanetary dust particles (see below). || 
|-id=862
| 7862 Keikonakamura ||  || Keiko Nakamura Messenger (born 1973), Japanese-American  space scientist at NASA's Johnson Space Center. Her work revealed the existence of organic globules in the Tagish Lake meteorite, furthering our understanding of organic material in the Solar System (see above). || 
|-id=863
| 7863 Turnbull || 1981 VK || Margaret Turnbull (born 1975), an American astrobiologist || 
|-id=864
| 7864 Borucki || 1982 EE || William Borucki (born 1939) founded and developed the Kepler mission that led to the discovery of numerous exoplanetary systems and to significant contributions to stellar astrophysics and astroseismology of evolving stars. He also determined plasma properties of hypervelocity shock waves that were used in the heat shield of the Apollo missions. || 
|-id=865
| 7865 Françoisgros ||  || François Gros (born 1925) is a molecular biologist and permanent secretary emeritus of the French Academy of Sciences. He is honorary professor at the College de France and at the Institut Pasteur. He is the president of COPED, the Committee of Developing Countries of the French Academy of Sciences || 
|-id=866
| 7866 Sicoli || 1982 TK || Piero Sicoli (born 1954), Italian amateur astronomer and discoverer of minor planets || 
|-id=867
| 7867 Burian ||  || Zdeněk Burian (1905–1981), Czech artist || 
|-id=868
| 7868 Barker ||  || Edwin S. Barker (born 1940), a research scientist at the McDonald Observatory of the University of Texas at Austin || 
|-id=869
| 7869 Pradun ||  || Valentin Panteleevich Pradun (born 1956), Ukrainian economist and professor at Tavrichesky National University, president of the Crimean Academy of Humanities || 
|-id=871
| 7871 Tunder ||  || Franz Tunder (1614–1667), German organist || 
|-id=873
| 7873 Böll ||  || Heinrich Böll (1917–1985), German novelist and recipient of the Nobel Prize for Literature in 1972 || 
|-id=881
| 7881 Schieferdecker ||  || Johann Christian Schieferdecker (1679–1732), German organist || 
|-id=885
| 7885 Levine ||  || Joanna L. Levine (born 1975), an astrophysicist, ballerina, and a yoga instructor. She attended Walnut Hill School to study ballet, obtained a Ph.D. from the University of Florida concentrating on star formation in Orion, and is currently a professor at Mt. Holyoke College. || 
|-id=886
| 7886 Redman || 1993 PE || Roderick Oliver Redman (1905–1975) and Russell Ormond Redman (born 1951), English and Canadian astronomers, respectively, who worked at the Dominion Astrophysical Observatory during significant parts of their careers || 
|-id=887
| 7887 Bratfest ||  || Oktoberfest style gathering hosted by the graduate students of the Lunar and Planetary Laboratory at the University of Arizona || 
|-id=890
| 7890 Yasuofukui ||  || Yasuo Fukui (born 1951), professor at Nagoya University and a radio astronomer specializing in molecular clouds and the birth of stars. He established and directs the operation of the "Nanten" millimeter-wavelength radio telescope at the Las Campanas Observatory in Chile. He is a winner of the Vainu Bappu Gold Medal and other prizes. Name proposed by the discoverers following a suggestion by T. Sato and A. Fujii || 
|-id=891
| 7891 Fuchie ||  || the Tokyo Metropolitan Fuchie Senior High School, where the first discoverer teaches astronomy and geology. Fuchie means the bank of a large river. This place has been called Fuchie for nearly a thousand years || 
|-id=892
| 7892 Musamurahigashi ||  || Musashimurayama East High School, Japan || 
|-id=894
| 7894 Rogers ||  || John H. Rogers (born 1952), director of the British Astronomical Association's Jupiter section since 1988, received the Association's Goodacre Medal in 2003. He is the author of The Giant Planet Jupiter (Cambridge University Press, 1995). By profession he is a molecular neurobiologist at the University of Cambridge || 
|-id=895
| 7895 Kaseda ||  || The Japanese city of Kaseda, now Minamisatsuma, located in the southwest of Kagoshima prefecture, birthplace of astronomer Fumiaki Uto, who discovered this minor planet || 
|-id=896
| 7896 Švejk || 1995 EC || The Good Soldier Švejk, character created by Jaroslav Hašek || 
|-id=897
| 7897 Bohuška ||  || Bohumila Šarounová, mother of Czech discoverer Lenka Kotková (Šarounová) || 
|-id=898
| 7898 Ohkuma ||  || Masami Ohkuma (born 1954) is an amateur astronomer who serves as chief editor of the Japanese astronomical monthly magazine Hoshi-Navi. He also plays an important role for the popularization of astronomy in Japan || 
|-id=899
| 7899 Joya ||  || Masanori Joya (1940–1967) was an early member of the Japan Lunar and Planetary Observers Network and played a vital role in its early development. He was the first discoverer in Japan of Jupiter's SEB Disturbance in 1962. He died tragically after losing his way in an unexpectedly heavy snowfall on Mt. Asama || 
|-id=900
| 7900 Portule ||  || Portule, the highest mountain peak in the Asiago tableland, near the Asiago Astrophysical Observatory. The wild mountain range is a trekking favorite for local astronomers || 
|}

7901–8000 

|-
| 7901 Konnai || 1996 DP || Reiichi Konnai (born 1950; former name Horiguchi), an eagle-eyed observer and dentist || 
|-id=902
| 7902 Hanff ||  || Johann Nikolaus Hanff (1663–1711), German organist || 
|-id=903
| 7903 Albinoni ||  || Tomaso Albinoni (1671–1751), Italian composer || 
|-id=904
| 7904 Morrow ||  || Walter Morrow (1928–2017), American long-time director of the MIT Lincoln Laboratory Src || 
|-id=905
| 7905 Juzoitami || 1997 OX || Juzo Itami (1933–1997), actor, translator, essayist, editor and well-known director since the great success of his first work Osoushiki (Funeral) || 
|-id=906
| 7906 Melanchton || 3081 P-L || Philip Melanchthon (1497–1560), a German reformer || 
|-id=907
| 7907 Erasmus || 4047 P-L || Erasmus (1466–1536), a Dutch humanist. He was the son of a priest and became a priest himself. In 1517 he was released by the pope from his holy vows, becoming an advisor to the emperor Charles V. He published papers critical of the practices of the Church; eventually he became the father of European humanism. He translated the classics, books of the church fathers and the New Testament into Latin in a critical way. His collection of proverbs helped shed new light on ancient literature and influenced religion, art and sciences || 
|-id=908
| 7908 Zwingli || 4192 T-1 || Ulrich Zwingli (1484–1531), a Swiss reformer of the church. He was originally a Catholic priest, but under the influence of the books of Erasmus and Luther he felt the need for reform. In 1523 he broke with the bishop, married and became a fervent puritan. For him the holy communion was only a symbolic celebration, and in this respect he did not agree with Luther. Zwingli died in a fight against the catholic cantons as a clergyman of the reformed soldiers. || 
|-id=909
| 7909 Ziffer || 1975 SK || Julie Ziffer (born 1974), a professor of physics at the University of Southern Maine, United States || 
|-id=910
| 7910 Aleksola ||  || Aleksandr Anatolievich Solov'ev, Russian (Kalmuk) poet, theoretical astrophysicist and solar physicist || 
|-id=911
| 7911 Carlpilcher ||  || Carl Bernard Pilcher, American astronomer who directs NASA's Solar System Exploration Program. While at M.I.T. and the University of Hawaii, Pilcher studied Jupiter's atmosphere and satellites, especially Io's interaction with Jupiter's magnetosphere, using ground-based telescopes. He has been a member of the imaging team of the Galileo mission to Jupiter since 1977. Pilcher has also studied international relations, sponsored by the MacArthur Foundation, at Princeton's Woodrow Wilson School, and with the skills he acquired worked at the Office of Space Science at NASA headquarters. He undertook strategic planning and other responsibilities at NASA prior to joining the planetary program during a time of unprecedented resurgence of planetary spacecraft launches. Citation written by C. R. Chapman. || 
|-id=912
| 7912 Lapovok ||  || Yakov Semenovich Lapovok (born 1932) is a radio engineer and inventor, scientific secretary of the A. S. Popov Museum at St. Petersburg Electrotechnical University || 
|-id=913
| 7913 Parfenov ||  || Anatoly Parfyonov (1925–1993), Russian classical wrestler and champion of the Melbourne Olympic games in 1956 || 
|-id=915
| 7915 Halbrook ||  || Timothy Halbrook (born 1959), American mechanical engineer who received NASA's Exceptional Public Service Medal and Exception Public Achievement Medal. He is the Proposal and Phase B Program Manager of the Lucy mission (Src). || 
|-id=916
| 7916 Gigiproietti || 1981 EN || Gigi Proietti (1940–2020) was an Italian theater actor, comedian, film actor and director, voice actor, singer, artistic director and director of Italian dubbing. He was a great mentor for many young actors. Name suggested by M. Di Martino. || 
|-id=917
| 7917 Hammergren ||  || Mark Hammergren (born 1964), an astronomer at the Adler Planetarium in Chicago || 
|-id=918
| 7918 Berrilli ||  || Francesco Berrilli (born 1958), a professor in the Physics Department of the University of Rome Tor Vergata || 
|-id=919
| 7919 Prime ||  || 7919, the one-thousandth prime number || 
|-id=921
| 7921 Huebner || 1982 RF || Walter F. Huebner (born 1928), contributor of small bodies studies in general, and to cometary studies in particular || 
|-id=922
| 7922 Violalaurenti ||  || Viola Laurenti (born 2015) is the first granddaughter of Mario Di Martino, astronomer at the Turin Astrophysical Observatory and colleague and friend of the discoverers. || 
|-id=923
| 7923 Chyba || 1983 WJ || Christopher Chyba (born 1959), American astrophysicist, astrobiologist, security advisor on nuclear proliferation and arms control || 
|-id=924
| 7924 Simbirsk ||  || Simbirsk, a region in Russia, formerly Ulyanovsk || 
|-id=925
| 7925 Shelus ||  || Peter J. Shelus (born 1942), a manager of the Lunar and Satellite Laser Ranging Projects at McDonald Observatory since 1982 || 
|-id=927
| 7927 Jamiegilmour ||  || Jamie Gilmour (born 1964) is an isotope cosmochemist at the University of Manchester (UK). He develops novel instrumentation to study the origin and evolution of meteorites using xenon isotopic signatures. || 
|-id=928
| 7928 Bijaoui ||  || Albert Bijaoui, French astronomer, born in Tunisia || 
|-id=931
| 7931 Kristianpedersen ||  || Kristian Pedersen (born 1966), Danish astrophysicist, winner of the 2004 Tycho Brahe Gold Medal || 
|-id=932
| 7932 Plimpton || 1989 GP || George Plimpton (1927–2003) was an American author, editor, actor and all-round Renaissance man. As the founding editor of the Paris Review, he fostered the careers of many now-famous writers. A giant in the world of participatory journalism, he chronicled his exploits as an amateur in many fields, especially professional sports || 
|-id=933
| 7933 Magritte ||  || René Magritte (1898–1967), Belgian painter and surrealist artist. In the 1930s composed his Magritte dictionary, placing ordinary objects, such as apples, stones and pipes, in a surrealistic context, thereby aiming to surprise and alienate. The philosophy of his work may best be summarized as "creating the unknown with known things". Citation written by K. Leterme at the request of the discoverer. || 
|-id=934
| 7934 Sinatra ||  || Frank Sinatra (1915–1998), singer || 
|-id=935
| 7935 Beppefenoglio ||  || Beppe Fenoglio (1922–1963), one of the greatest Italian writers of the twentieth century. || 
|-id=936
| 7936 Mikemagee ||  || Michael Magee (born 1958) has had a distinguished career with the University of Arizona's Flandrau Science Center and Planetarium since 1980. Throughout two decades Magee has been largely responsible for the planetarium's production of astronomy shows and its outreach program. || 
|-id=939
| 7939 Asphaug ||  || Erik Ian Asphaug (born 1961), a Norwegian American astronomer || 
|-id=940
| 7940 Erichmeyer ||  || Erich Meyer (born 1951), an Austrian engineer and amateur astronomer. This minor planet was named on the occasion of his 20th anniversary as an astrometricist. Using a measuring engine he constructed himself, Meyer measured about 250 precise positions of minor planets and comets from photographic plates. Among the 2600 positions he derived after switching to CCD equipment in 1993 are some for the 1997 opposition of this object, thereby rendering it appropriate for numbering. An electrical engineer by profession, Meyer is also a well-known astrophotographer and popularizer of astronomy. || 
|-id=945
| 7945 Kreisau ||  || Anti-Nazi resistance group formed in 1942 in Silesia at the Kreisau farm, the family estate of H. J. Graf von Moltke. The members of the group, called Kreisauer Kreis || 
|-id=947
| 7947 Toland ||  || John Toland (1670–1722), Irish-born rationalist philosopher and freethinker || 
|-id=948
| 7948 Whitaker || 1992 HY || Ewen Whitaker (1922–2016), a British born planetary scientist and lunar astronomer from the Lunar and Planetary Laboratory at UA || 
|-id=950
| 7950 Berezov ||  || Beryozovo, Russian town || 
|-id=953
| 7953 Kawaguchi || 1993 KP || Masaya Kawaguchi (born 1959), a chief editor of the Japanese astronomical magazine Sky Watcher during 1987–2000 || 
|-id=954
| 7954 Kitao ||  || Koichi Kitao (born 1953), a Japanese amateur astronomer || 
|-id=955
| 7955 Ogiwara || 1993 WE || Tetsuo Ogiwara (born 1950), a Japanese amateur astronomer || 
|-id=956
| 7956 Yaji || 1993 YH || Kentaro Yaji (born 1966), the director of Kawabe Cosmic Park in Wakayama prefecture || 
|-id=957
| 7957 Antonella || 1994 BT || Antonella Bartolini (born 1956), amateur astronomer and friend of the discoverers || 
|-id=958
| 7958 Leakey ||  || Mary Leakey (1913–1996), her husband Louis Leakey (1903–1972), and their son Richard Leakey (born 1944), all major figures in the paleoanthropology of Africa || 
|-id=959
| 7959 Alysecherri || 1994 PK || Alyse Cherri Hergenrother, née Alyse Cherri Smith, wife of the discoverer || 
|-id=960
| 7960 Condorcet ||  || Marquis de Condorcet (1743–1794), a French philosopher and mathematician || 
|-id=961
| 7961 Ercolepoli ||  || Ercole Poli (1961–2000), Italian amateur astronomer || 
|-id=963
| 7963 Falcinelli || 1995 CA || Amleto Falcinelli (1921–1996), Italian bantam-weight boxing champion || 
|-id=965
| 7965 Katsuhiko ||  || Katsuhiko Sato (born 1945), professor at University of Tokyo and director of the Research Center of the Early Universe since 1995 || 
|-id=966
| 7966 Richardbaum || 1996 DA || Richard Myer Baum (born 1930), British amateur astronomer and author || 
|-id=967
| 7967 Beny ||  || Michal "Beny" Böhm, friend of the discoverer || 
|-id=968
| 7968 Elst-Pizarro || 1996 N2 || Eric Walter Elst (born 1936), Belgian astronomer and Guido Pizarro, astronomer at ESO || 
|-id=970
| 7970 Lichtenberg || 6065 P-L || Georg Christoph Lichtenberg (1742–1799), German physicist || 
|-id=971
| 7971 Meckbach || 9002 P-L || Wolfgang Meckbach (1919–1998), microwave spectroscopist || 
|-id=972
| 7972 Mariotti || 1174 T-1 || Jean-Marie Mariotti (1955–1998), French astronomer || 
|-id=973
| 7973 Koppeschaar || 1344 T-2 || Carl Egon Koppeschaar, Dutch science writer and reporter in the Netherlands. He is internationally known for popularizing astrophysics and space science, for debunking pseudoscience, and for taking action against light pollution. His Moon Handbook: a 21st-Century Travel Guide is a delight. || 
|-id=974
| 7974 Vermeesch || 2218 T-2 || Theo Vermeesch (born 1930), former director of the Simon Stevin Popular Observatory at Hoeven in the Netherlands || 
|-id=976
| 7976 Pinigin ||  || Gennadii Ivanovich Pinigin (born 1943), Russian astronomer, director of the Nikolaev Astronomical Observatory. A prominent specialist in fundamental astrometry and astronomical instrument-making, he made a valuable contribution to the creation of new types of meridian instruments at the Pulkovo and Nikolaev observatories. || 
|-id=978
| 7978 Niknesterov ||  || Nikolaj Semenovich Nesterov (1947–2002), head of the Radioastronomy Department at the Crimean Astrophysical Observatory || 
|-id=979
| 7979 Pozharskij ||  || Dmitry Pozharsky (1578–1642), a Russian prince, statesman and soldier || 
|-id=980
| 7980 Senkevich ||  || Yurij Aleksandrovich Senkevich (born 1937), a scientist at the Institute of Medical and Biological Problems of the Russian Academy of Sciences || 
|-id=981
| 7981 Katieoakman ||  || Katie Oakman (born 1964) American mechanical engineer and Spacecraft Structures and Mechanisms Lead of the Lucy mission. She also oversaw the construction of Lucy's 7.3-meter photovoltaic array. || 
|-id=982
| 7982 Timmartin ||  || Timothy A. Martin (born 1963) American mechanical engineer and Propulsion Lead of the Lucy mission. || 
|-id=983
| 7983 Festin || 1980 FY || Leif Festin (born 1967), a Swedish astronomer. This minor planet was named to celebrate the completion of his Ph.D. thesis on the faint end of the luminosity function. He assisted with photometric observations of minor planets while he was working at the Nordic Optical Telescope on La Palma. He is co-author of several publications on lightcurves of minor planets. || 
|-id=984
| 7984 Marius || 1980 SM || Simon Marius (1573–1625), a court astronomer in Ansbach || 
|-id=985
| 7985 Nedelcu ||  || Dan Alin Nedelcu (born 1976), a research scientist at the Astronomical Institute of the Romanian Academy || 
|-id=986
| 7986 Romania ||  || The country of Romania is located in southeast Europe, with Bucharest as its capital || 
|-id=987
| 7987 Walshkevin ||  || Kevin John Walsh (born 1978), a scientist at the Southwest Research Institute of Boulder, CO || 
|-id=988
| 7988 Pucacco ||  || Giuseppe Pucacco (born 1956), a researcher in the Physics Department of the University of Rome Tor Vergata || 
|-id=989
| 7989 Pernadavide ||  || Davide Perna (born 1979), a postdoctoral fellow at the Istituto Nazionale di Astrofisica Osservatorio Astronomico di Capodimonte, Italy || 
|-id=991
| 7991 Kaguyahime ||  || Main female character in old Japanese romance Taketori-monogatari || 
|-id=992
| 7992 Yozan || 1981 WC || Uesugi Yozan (1751–1822), the ninth lord of Yamagata prefecture's Yonezawa Castle, was the greatest ruler of his clan || 
|-id=993
| 7993 Johnbridges ||  || John Bridges (born 1966), based at the University of Leicester, is an expert on the mineralogy and petrology of martian meteorites, chondritic meteorites and cometary material returned by the Stardust mission. He has been a participating scientist in Mars Science Laboratory rover mission. || 
|-id=994
| 7994 Bethellen ||  || Beth Ellen Clark (born 1964), an American astronomer † || 
|-id=995
| 7995 Khvorostovsky || 1983 PX || Dmitri Hvorostovsky (1962–2017), a Russian operatic baritone || 
|-id=996
| 7996 Vedernikov ||  || Alexander Filipovich Vedernikov (born 1927), Russian bass, father of conductor Alexander Vedernikov (born 1964) || 
|-id=998
| 7998 Gonczi || 1985 JK || Robert Gonczi (born 1945), a French dynamicist || 
|-id=999
| 7999 Nesvorný ||  || David Nesvorný (born 1969), a Czech astronomer and dynamicist || 
|-id=000
| 8000 Isaac Newton ||  || Isaac Newton (1643–1727), an English mathematician and physicist and one of the most influential scientists ever || 
|}

References 

007001-008000